= Massachusetts =

U.S. state

- State
- Commonwealth of Massachusetts
- Flag Seal
- Nicknames: The Bay State (official); The Pilgrim State; The Puritan State; The Old Colony State; The Baked Bean State; The Spirit of America
- Motto(s): Ense petit placidam sub libertate quietem (Latin); By the sword we seek peace, but peace only under liberty
- Anthem: "All Hail to Massachusetts"
- Location of Massachusetts within the United States
- Country: United States
- Before statehood: Province of Massachusetts Bay (1691–1780, independent from the UK in 1776), became Commonwealth of Massachusetts under 1780 constitution
- Admitted to the Union: February 6, 1788 (6th)
- Capital (and largest city): Boston
- Largest county or equivalent: Middlesex
- Largest metro and urban areas: Greater Boston

Government
  - Governor: Maura Healey (D)
  - Lieutenant Governor: Kim Driscoll (D)
- Legislature: General Court
  - Upper house: Senate
  - Lower house: House of Representatives
- Judiciary: Massachusetts Supreme Judicial Court
- U.S. senators: Elizabeth Warren (D); Ed Markey (D)
- U.S. House delegation: 9 Democrats (list)

Area
  - Total: 10,565 sq mi (27,363 km^{2})
  - Land: 7,800 sq mi (20,202 km^{2})
  - Water: 2,715 sq mi (7,032 km^{2}) 26.1%
  - Rank: 44th

Dimensions
  - Length: 184 mi (296 km)
  - Width: 114 mi (184 km)
- Elevation: 490 ft (150 m)
- Highest elevation (Mount Greylock (Note: Elevation adjusted to North American Vertical Datum of 1988)): 3,489 ft (1,063.4 m)
- Lowest elevation (Atlantic Ocean): 0 ft (0 m)

Population (2025)
  - Total: ▲7,154,084
  - Rank: 16th
  - Density: 914.9/sq mi (353.24/km^{2})
  - Rank: 3rd
  - Median household income: $99,900 (2023)
  - Income rank: 1st
- Demonym: Bay Stater (official) Masshole (colloquial) Massachusettsan (recommended by the U.S. GPO) Massachusite (traditional)

Language
  - Official language: English
  - Spoken language: English 75.00%; Spanish 9.55%; Portuguese 3.43%; Chinese 2.05%
- Time zone: UTC– 05:00 (Eastern)
  - Summer (DST): UTC– 04:00 (EDT)
- USPS abbreviation: MA
- ISO 3166 code: US-MA
- Traditional abbreviation: Mass.
- Latitude: 41°14′ N to 42°53′ N
- Longitude: 69°56′ W to 73°30′ W
- Website: mass.gov

State symbols of Massachusetts
List of state symbols
- Flag of Massachusetts

- Seal of Massachusetts

- Coat of arms of Massachusetts
- Poem: Blue Hills of Massachusetts
- Slogan: Make It Yours, The Spirit of America

Living insignia
- Bird: Black-capped chickadee, wild turkey
- Fish: Cod
- Flower: Mayflower
- Insect: Ladybug
- Mammal: Right whale, Morgan horse, Tabby cat, Boston Terrier
- Reptile: Garter snake
- Tree: American elm

Inanimate insignia
- Beverage: Cranberry juice
- Color(s): Blue, green, cranberry
- Dance: Square dance
- Food: Cranberry, corn muffin, navy bean, Boston cream pie, chocolate chip cookie, Boston cream doughnut
- Fossil: Dinosaur Tracks
- Gemstone: Rhodonite
- Mineral: Babingtonite
- Rock: Roxbury Puddingstone
- Shell: New England Neptune, Neptunea lyrata decemcostata
- Ship: Schooner Ernestina
- Soil: Paxton
- Sport: Basketball

State route marker

State quarter
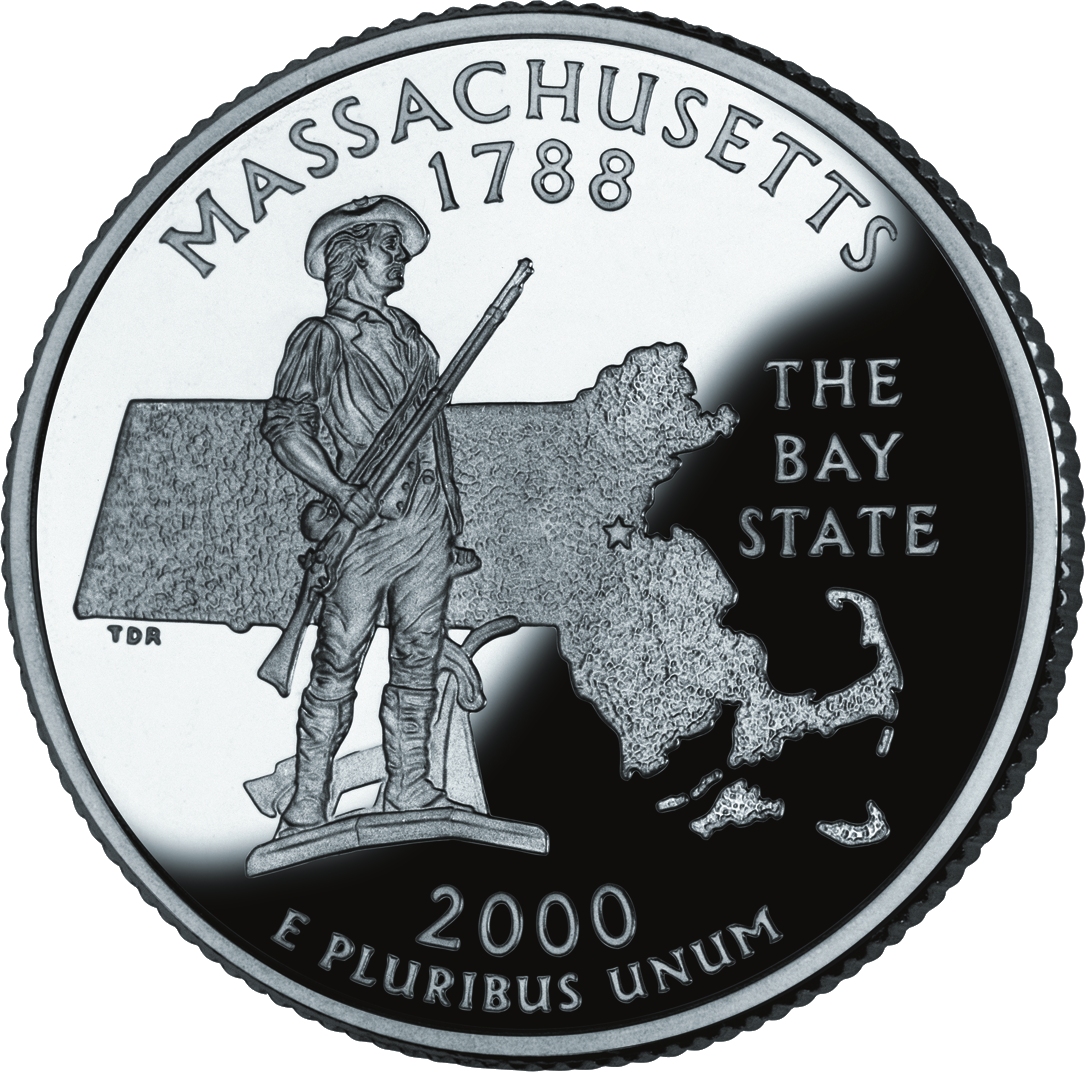
- Released in 2000

Massachusetts (/mæsəˈtʃ(j)uːsɪts/ /-zɪts/ MASS-ə-CHOO-sits, -zits; Massachusett: Muhsachuweesut [məhswatʃəwiːsət]), officially the Commonwealth of Massachusetts, (Note: Massachusetts is one of only four U.S. states to use the term "Commonwealth" in its official name, along with Kentucky, Virginia, and Pennsylvania.) is a state in the New England region of the Northeastern United States. It borders the Atlantic Ocean and the Gulf of Maine to its east, Connecticut and Rhode Island to its south, New Hampshire and Vermont to its north, and New York to its west. Massachusetts is the seventh-smallest state by land area. With an estimated population of over 7.1 million, (Note: 2024 U.S. Census Bureau) it is the most populous state in New England (with nearly half of all New Englanders residing in Massachusetts), the 16th-most-populous in the United States, and the third-most densely populated U.S. state after New Jersey and Rhode Island.

Massachusetts was a site of early English colonization. The Plymouth Colony was founded in 1620 by the Pilgrims of Mayflower. In 1630, the Massachusetts Bay Colony, taking its name from the Indigenous Massachusett people, also established settlements in Boston and Salem. In 1692, the town of Salem and surrounding areas experienced one of America's most infamous cases of mass hysteria, the Salem witch trials. The American Revolution originated in Massachusetts, with Boston becoming known as the "Cradle of Liberty" for its political agitation. In 1786, Shays' Rebellion, a populist revolt, influenced the United States Constitutional Convention. Originally dependent on agriculture, fishing, and trade, Massachusetts transformed into a manufacturing hub during the Industrial Revolution. Before the American Civil War, the state was a center for the abolitionist, temperance, and transcendentalist movements. During the 20th century, the state's economy shifted from manufacturing to services; in the 21st century, Massachusetts has become the global leader in biotechnology, and also excels in artificial intelligence, engineering, higher education, finance, and maritime trade.

Boston is Massachusetts' capital and most populous city, as well as its cultural and financial center; other major cities are Worcester, Springfield, and Cambridge. The state also hosts the urban core of Greater Boston, the largest metropolitan area in New England, with profound influence on U.S. history, academia, and the research economy. Massachusetts is the only U.S. state with a right to shelter law, and was the first U.S. state—and one of the earliest jurisdictions in the world—to legally recognize same-sex marriage. Harvard University in Cambridge is the oldest institution of higher learning in the United States, with the largest financial endowment of any university in the world. Both Harvard and MIT, also in Cambridge, are perennially ranked as either the most or among the most highly regarded academic institutions in the world.

Massachusetts is the most educated U.S. state, ranking first by the percentage of population 25 and over with either a bachelor's degree or advanced degree. Its public school system ranks first in the country, with public school students placing among the top tier in the world in academic performance. Massachusetts is among the wealthiest and most developed states, and has been credited with the best-performing economy. Massachusetts also ranks first in innovation among all U.S. states; first on the American Human Development and United Nations Human Development indexes; first in per capita income; and first in median income, both by household and individually. Massachusetts has the highest health insurance coverage rate of any U.S. state, with approximately 98% of residents insured. Overall, Massachusetts often ranks as the U.S. state with the highest quality of life, though also one of the most costly.

== Etymology ==
The Massachusetts Bay Colony was named after the Indigenous population, the Massachusett or Muhsachuweesut, whose name likely derived from the Wôpanâak word muswachasut, segmented as mus(ây) "big" + wach "mountain" + -s "diminutive" + -ut "locative". This word has been translated as "near the great hill", "by the blue hills", "at the little big hill", or "at the range of hills", in reference to the Blue Hills—namely, the Great Blue Hill, located on the boundary of Milton and Canton. Massachusett has also been represented as Moswetuset. This comes from the name of the Moswetuset Hummock (meaning "hill shaped like an arrowhead") in Quincy, where Plymouth Colony commander Myles Standish (a hired English military officer) and Squanto (a member of the Patuxet band of the Wamponoag people, who have since died off due to contagious diseases brought by colonists) met Chief Chickatawbut in 1621.

Although the designation "Commonwealth" forms part of the state's official name, it has no practical implications in modern times, and Massachusetts has the same position and powers within the United States as other states. John Adams may have chosen the word in 1779 for the second draft of what became the 1780 Massachusetts Constitution; unlike the word "state", the word "commonwealth" had the connotation of a republic at the time. This was in contrast to the monarchy the former colonies were fighting against during the American Revolutionary War. The name "State of Massachusetts Bay" appeared in the first draft, which was ultimately rejected. It was also chosen to include the "Cape Islands" in reference to Martha's Vineyard and Nantucket—from 1780 to 1844, they were seen as additional and separate entities confined within the Commonwealth.

== History ==
=== Pre-colonization ===
Massachusetts was originally inhabited by tribes of the Algonquian language family, including the Wampanoag, Narragansett, Nipmuc, Pocomtuc, Mahican, and Massachusett. While cultivation of crops like squash and corn were an important part of their diet, the people of these tribes hunted, fished, and searched the forest for most of their food. Villagers lived in lodges called wigwams as well as longhouses. Tribes were led by male or female elders known as sachems.

=== Colonial period ===
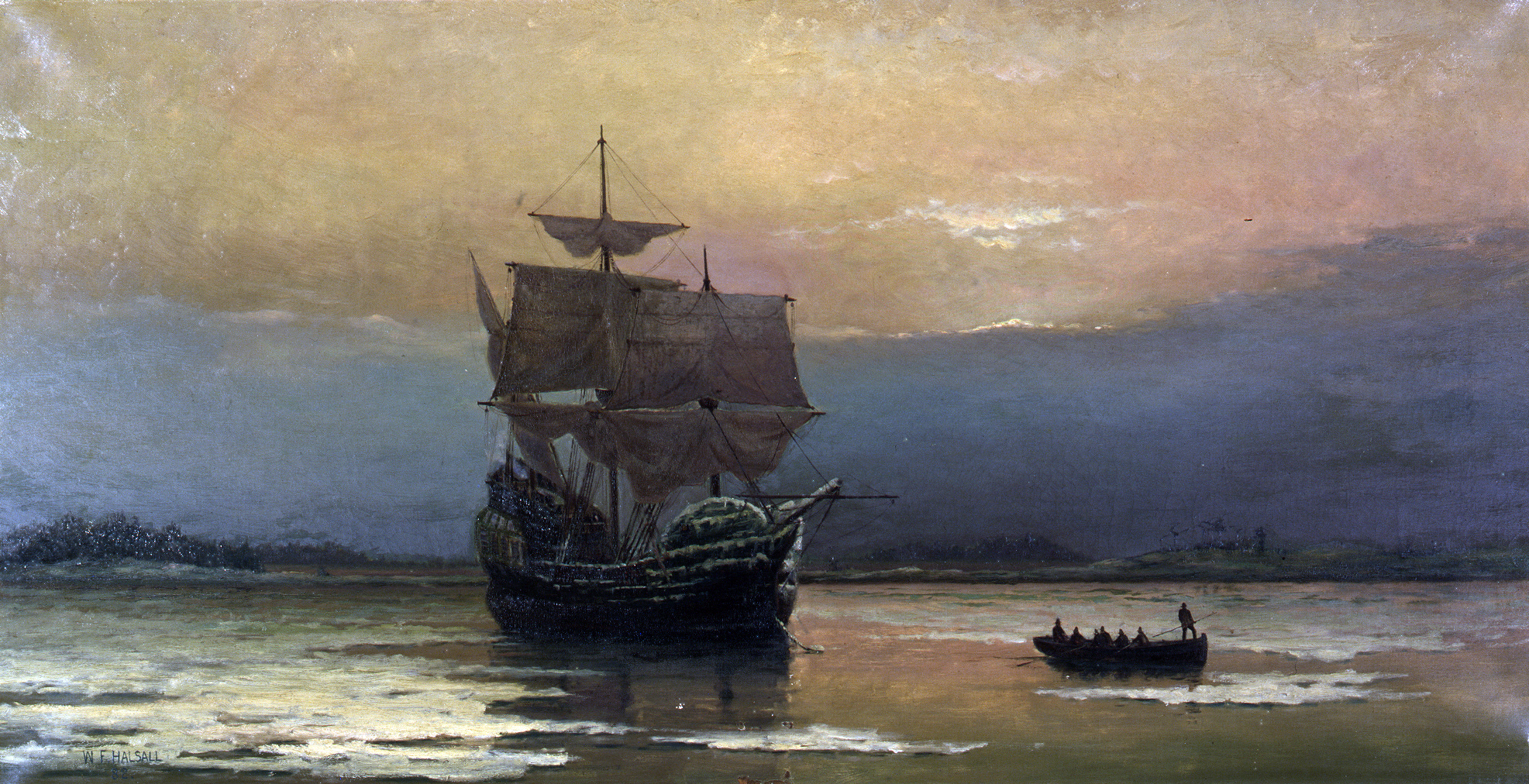
The Mayflower in Plymouth Harbor by William Halsall (1882). The Pilgrims founded Plymouth in 1620.

During the early 1600s, European colonists caused virgin soil epidemics such as smallpox, measles, influenza, and perhaps leptospirosis in what is now known as the northeastern region of the United States. Between 1617 and 1619, a disease that was most likely smallpox killed approximately 90% of the Massachusetts Bay Native Americans.

The first English colonists in Massachusetts Bay Colony landed with Richard Vines and spent the winter in Biddeford Pool near Cape Porpoise (after 1820 the State of Maine) in 1616. The Puritans arrived at Plymouth in 1620. This was the second permanent English colony in the part of North America that later became the United States, after the Jamestown Colony. The "First Thanksgiving" was celebrated by the Puritans after their first harvest in the "New World" and lasted for three days. They were soon followed by other Puritans, who colonized the Massachusetts Bay Colony—now known as Boston—in 1630.

The Puritans believed the Church of England needed to be further reformed along Protestant Calvinist lines, and experienced harassment due to the religious policies of King Charles I and high-ranking clergy such as William Laud, who would become Charles's Archbishop of Canterbury, whom they feared were re-introducing "Romish" elements to the national church. They decided to colonize Massachusetts, intending to establish what they considered an "ideal" religious society. The Massachusetts Bay Colony was colonized under a royal charter, unlike the Plymouth colony, in 1629. Both religious dissent and expansionism resulted in several new colonies being founded, shortly after Plymouth and Massachusetts Bay, elsewhere in New England. The Massachusetts Bay banished dissenters such as Anne Hutchinson and Roger Williams due to religious and political conflict. In 1636, Williams colonized what is now known as Rhode Island, and Hutchinson joined him there several years later. Religious intolerance continued, and among those who objected to this later that century were the English Quaker preachers Alice and Thomas Curwen, who were publicly flogged and imprisoned in Boston in 1676.

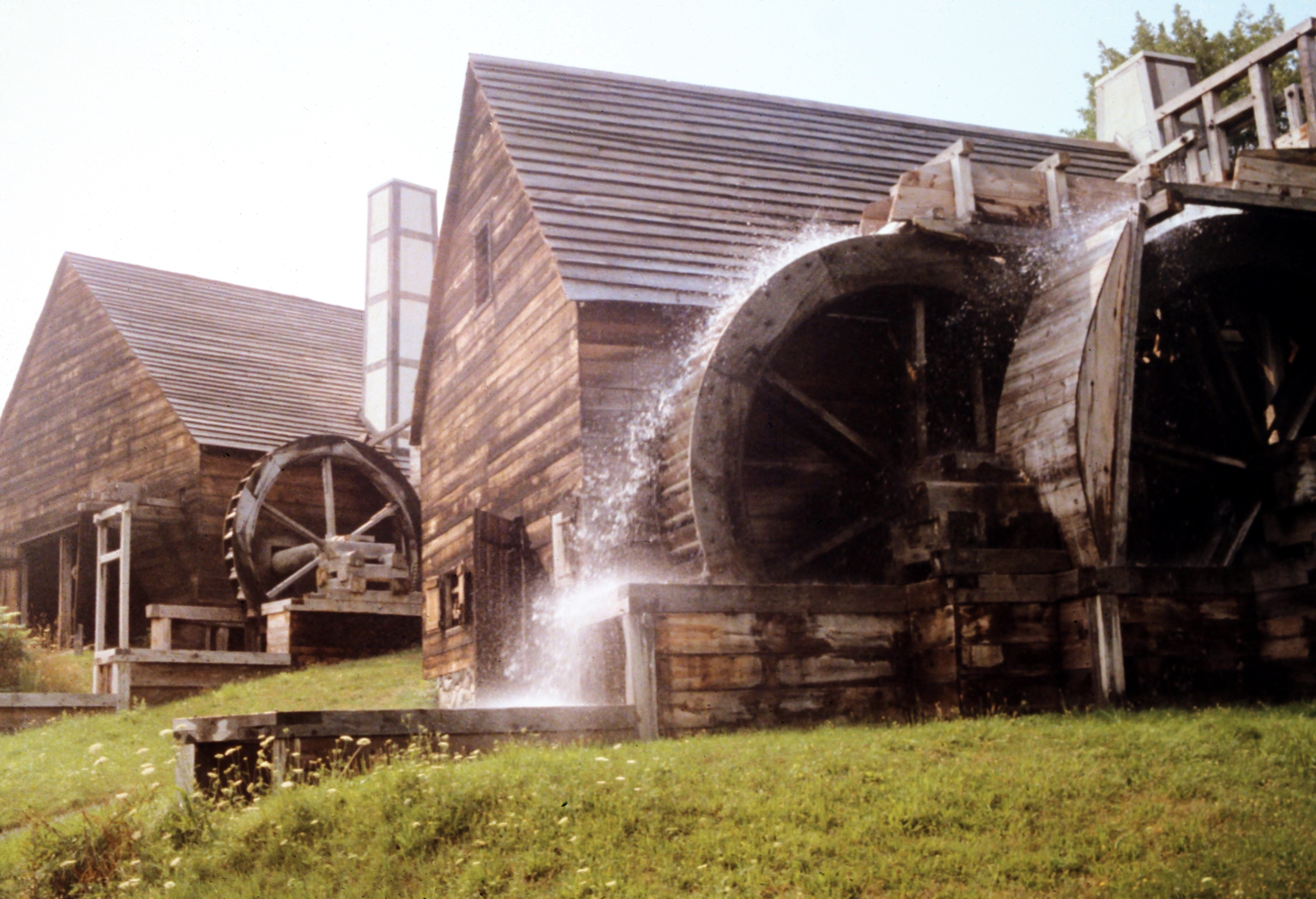
In 1646, John Winthrop the Younger established the Saugus Iron Works, which was the first integrated ironworks in North America. It included a blast furnace, forge, rolling mill, shear, slitter and a quarter-ton trip hammer, all of which has been restored and is now a museum.

By 1641, Massachusetts had expanded inland significantly. The Commonwealth acquired the Connecticut River Valley settlement of Springfield, which had recently experienced disputes with—and defected from—its original administrators, the Connecticut Colony. This established Massachusetts's southern border in the west. However, this became disputed territory until 1803–04 due to surveying problems, leading to the modern Southwick Jog.

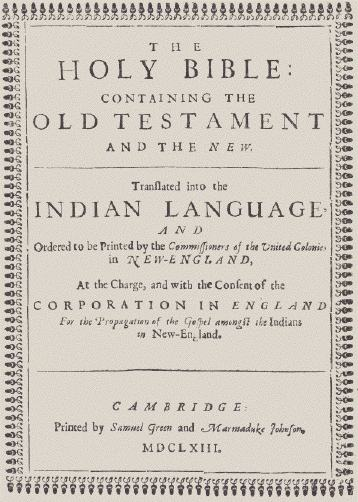
The Mamusse Wunneetupanatamwe Up-Biblum God (cover page shown), also called the Eliot Indian Bible, is the first Bible to have been printed in British North America.

In 1652 the Massachusetts General Court authorized Boston silversmith John Hull to produce local coinage in shilling, sixpence and threepence denominations to address a coin shortage in the colony. Prior to Hull's local coinage production, the colony's economy remained dependent on barter and foreign currency, including English, Spanish, Dutch, Portuguese and counterfeit coins. In 1661, shortly after the restoration of the British monarchy, the British government considered the Boston mint to be treasonous. However, the colony ignored the English demands to cease operations until at least 1682, when Hull's contract as mintmaster expired, and the colony did not move to renew his contract or appoint a new mintmaster. The coinage was a contributing factor to the revocation of the Massachusetts Bay Colony charter in 1684.

Tensions with the Native Americans resulted in King Philip's War from 1675 to 1678. The Native Americans, led by Metacom or King Philip, attacked half the towns in Massachusetts and destroyed many of them. During King William's War and Queen Anne's War, Massachusetts and the other New England colonies engaged in expeditionary campaigns in Quebec and Acadia.

In 1691, the English Crown issued a new charter uniting the colonies of Massachusetts Bay and Plymouth—along with the territory of Maine—into the Province of Massachusetts Bay. Shortly after, the new province's first governor, William Phips, arrived. The Salem witch trials also took place, where a number of men and women were hanged for alleged witchcraft.

The most destructive earthquake known to date in New England occurred on November 18, 1755, causing considerable damage across Massachusetts.

=== Revolutionary War ===
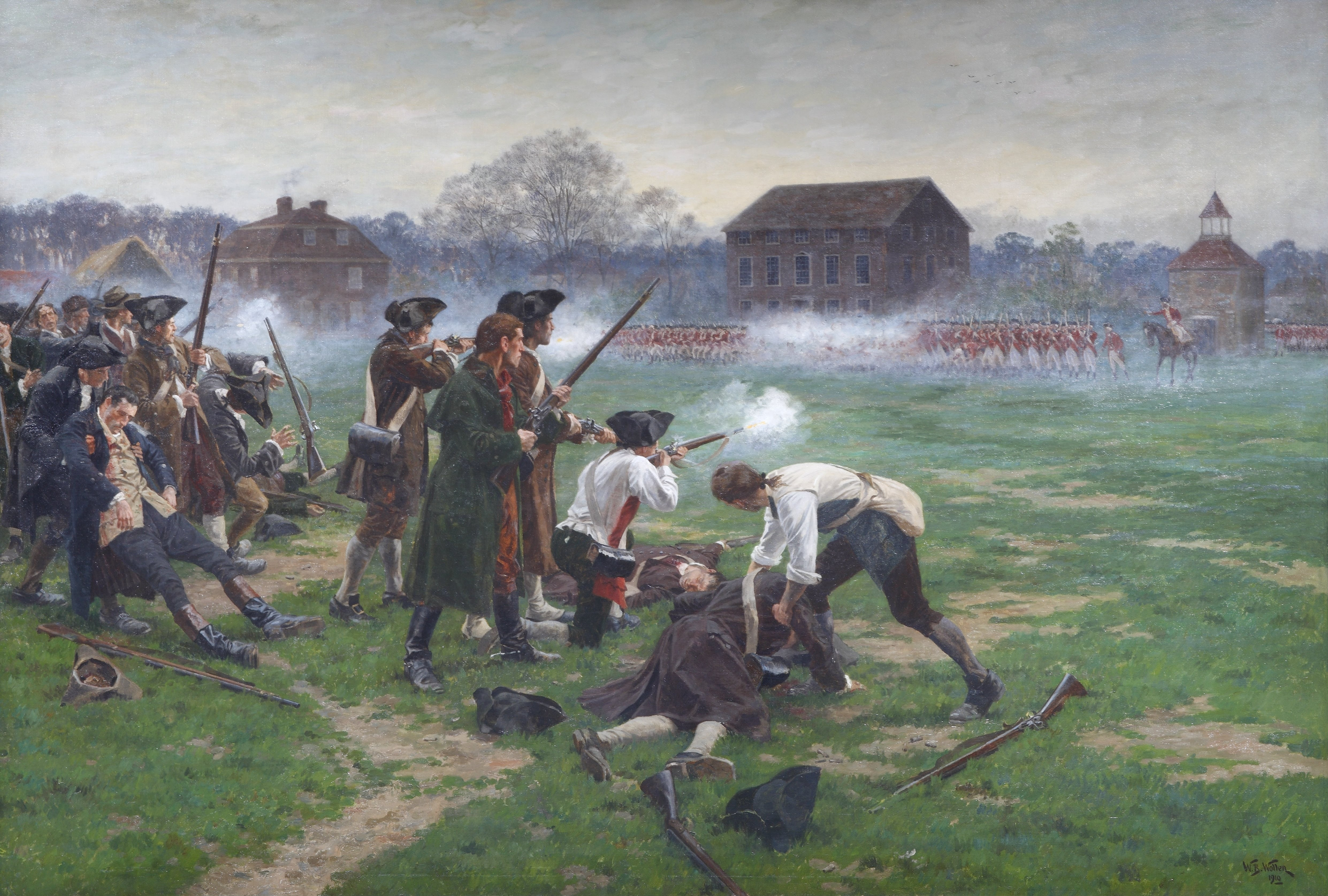
A 1910 painting of the Battle of Lexington

Massachusetts was a center of the movement for independence from Great Britain. Colonists in Massachusetts had long had uneasy relations with the British monarchy, including open rebellion under the Dominion of New England in the 1680s. Protests against British attempts to tax the colonies after the French and Indian War ended in 1763 led to the Boston Massacre in 1770, and the 1773 Boston Tea Party escalated tensions. In 1774, the Intolerable Acts targeted Massachusetts with punishments for the Boston Tea Party and further decreased local autonomy, increasing local dissent. Anti-Parliamentary activity by men such as Samuel Adams and John Hancock, followed by reprisals by the British government, were a primary reason for the unity of the Thirteen Colonies and the outbreak of the American Revolution in 1775.

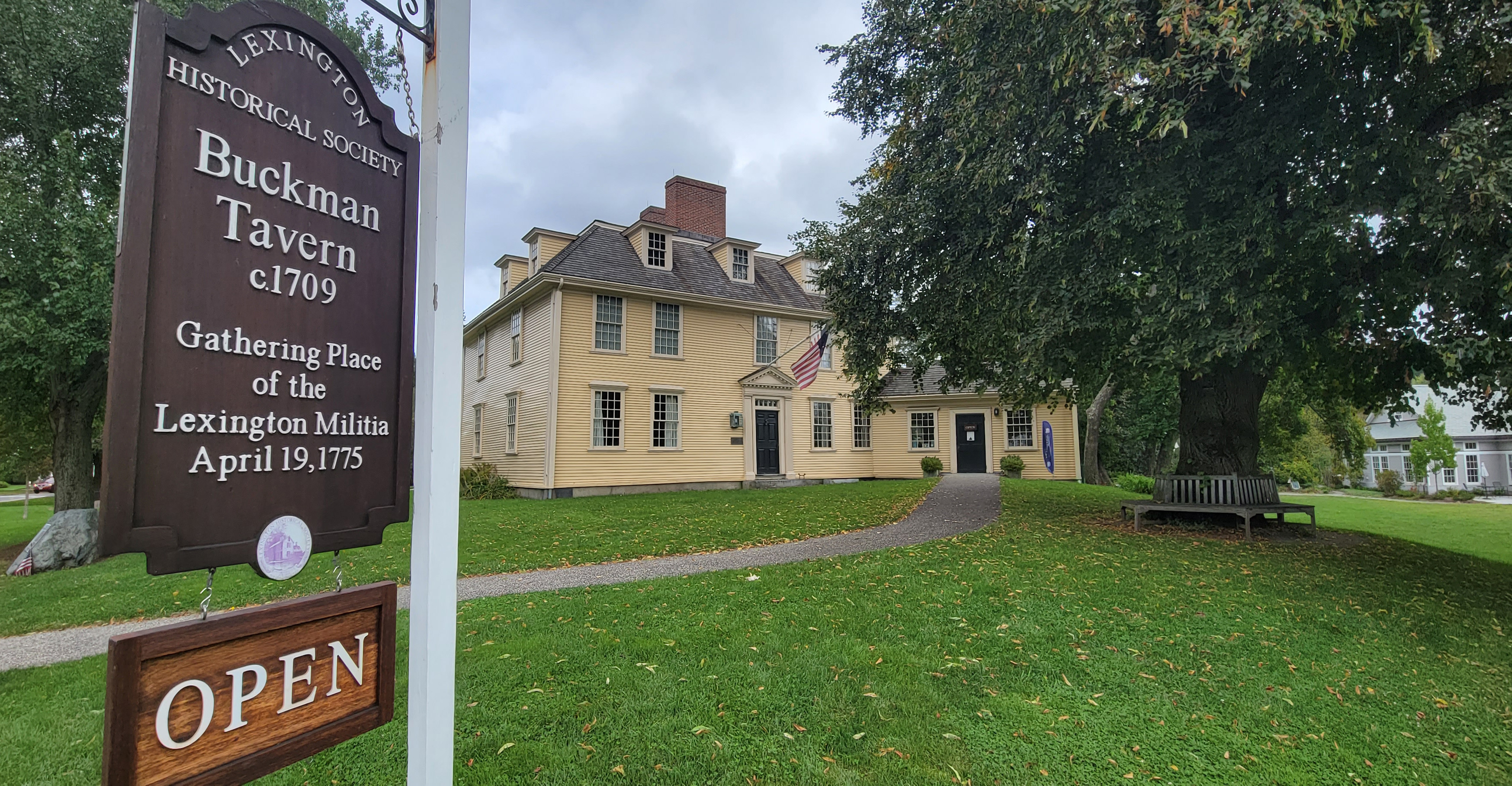
The first shots of the American Revolution were fired on Lexington Green in front of Buckman Tavern. The tavern is now a museum.

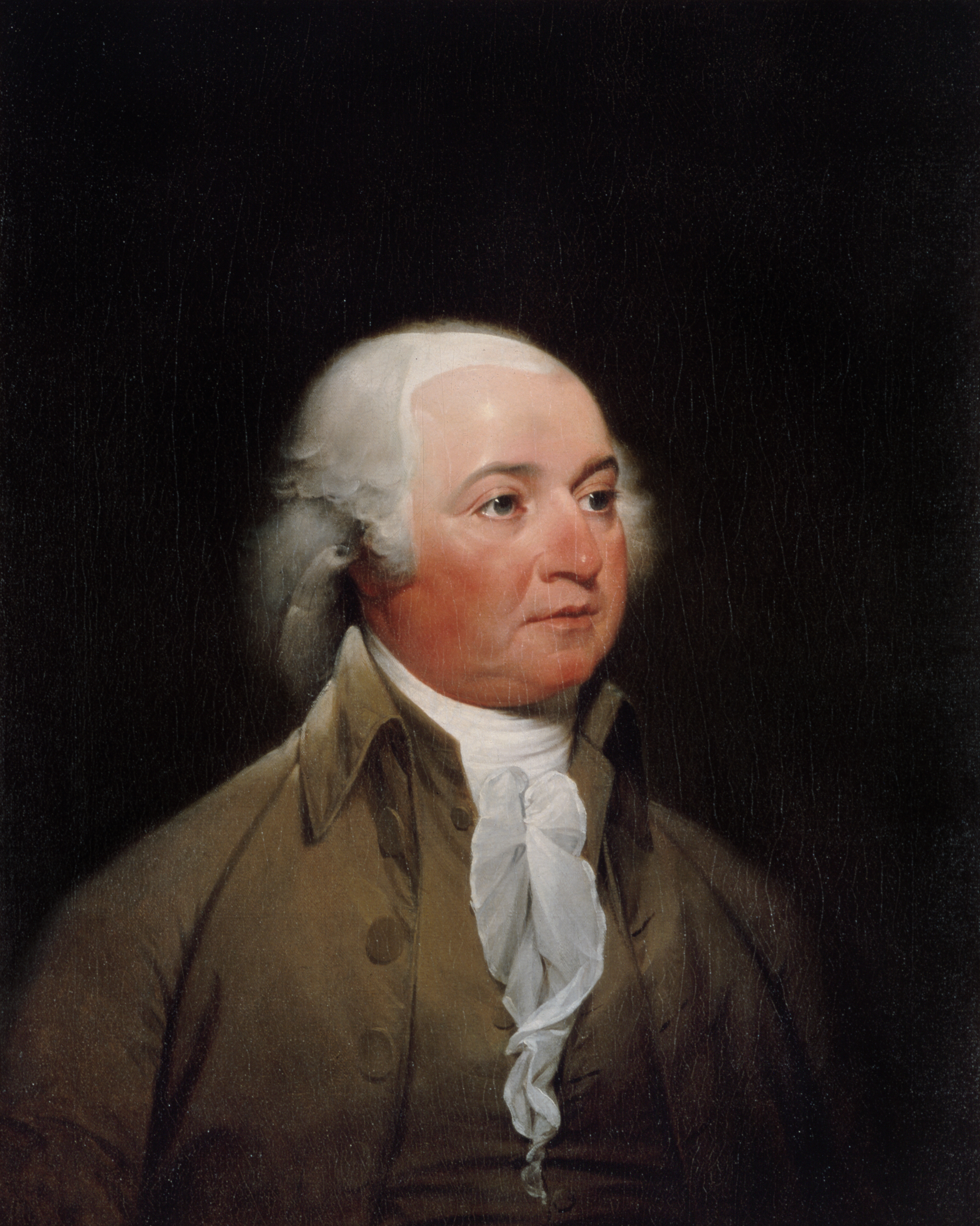
John Adams was 2nd President of the United States (1797–1801).

The Battles of Lexington and Concord were fought in Massachusetts in 1775, and initiated the American Revolutionary War. George Washington, later the first president of the future country, took over what would become the Continental Army after the battle. His first victory was the siege of Boston in the winter of 1775–76, after which the British were forced to evacuate the city. The event is still celebrated in Suffolk County only every March 17 as Evacuation Day.

On the coast, Salem became a center for privateering. Although the documentation is incomplete, about 1,700 letters of marque, issued on a per-voyage basis, were granted during the American Revolution. Nearly 800 vessels were commissioned as privateers, which were credited with capturing or destroying about 600 British ships.

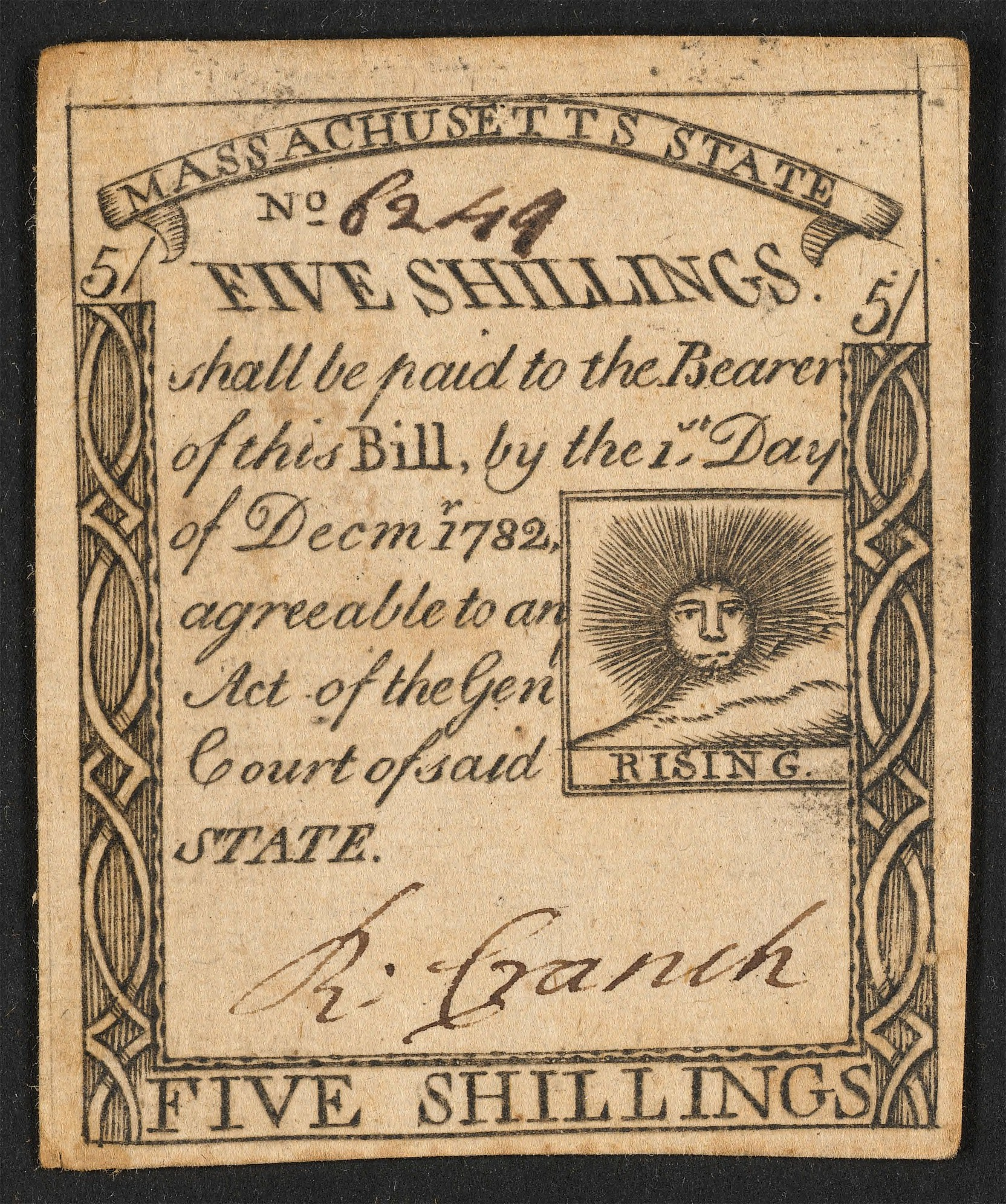
This five-shilling note was issued by Massachusetts in 1779.

=== Federal period ===
Bostonian John Adams, known as the "Atlas of Independence", was highly involved in both separation from Britain and the Constitution of Massachusetts, which effectively (the Elizabeth Freeman and Quock Walker cases as interpreted by William Cushing) made Massachusetts the first state to abolish slavery. David McCullough points out that an equally important feature was its placing for the first time the courts as a co-equal branch separate from the executive. (The Constitution of Vermont, adopted in 1777, represented the first partial ban on slavery among the states. Vermont became a state in 1791 but did not fully ban slavery until 1858 with the Vermont Personal Liberty Law. The Pennsylvania Gradual Abolition Act of 1780 made Pennsylvania the first state to abolish slavery by statute – the second English colony to do so; the first having been the Colony of Georgia in 1735.) Later, Adams was active in early American foreign affairs and succeeded Washington as the second president of the United States. His son, John Quincy Adams, also from Massachusetts, would go on to become the nation's sixth president.

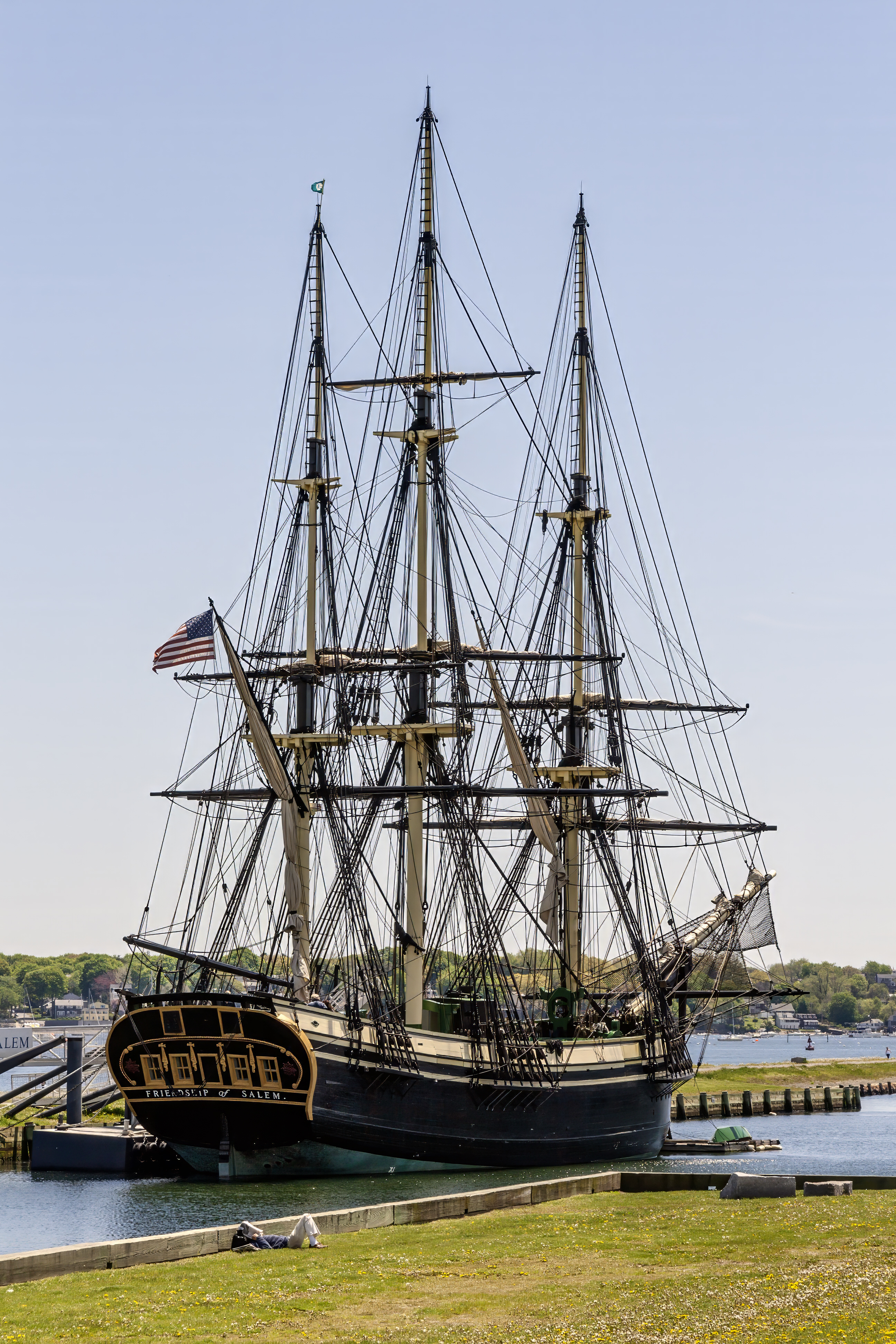
The Friendship of Salem at Salem Maritime National Historic Site in Salem, is a replica of an 18th-century East Indiaman. Salem was a major port and the spice trade was very lucrative, resulting in Salem having the highest per capita income in the United States in the early 1800s. The Friendship was owned by Jerathmeil Peirce and Aaron Waite. Peirce's mansion in Salem is preserved by the Peabody Essex Museum.

From 1786 to 1787, an armed uprising led by Revolutionary War veteran Daniel Shays, now known as Shays' Rebellion, wrought havoc throughout Massachusetts and ultimately attempted to seize the federal Springfield Armory. The rebellion was one of the major factors in the decision to draft a stronger national constitution to replace the Articles of Confederation. On February 6, 1788, Massachusetts became the sixth state to ratify the United States Constitution.

=== 19th century ===
In 1820, Maine separated from Massachusetts and entered the Union as the 23rd state due to the ratification of the Missouri Compromise.

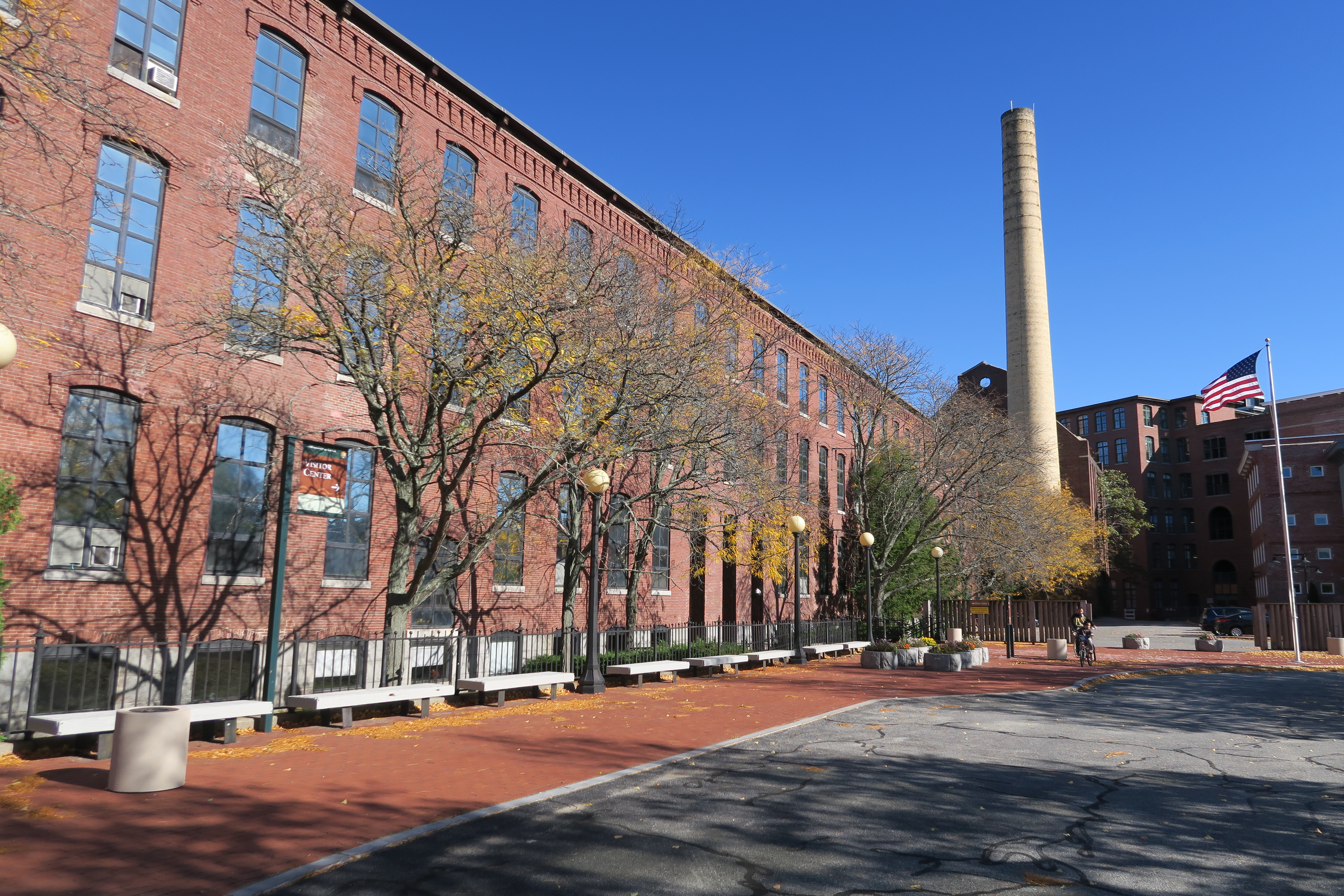
Textile mills, such as the one depicted here in Lowell, made Massachusetts a leader in the Industrial Revolution.

During the 19th century, Massachusetts became a national leader in the American Industrial Revolution, with factories around cities such as Lowell and Boston producing textiles and shoes, and factories around Springfield producing tools, paper, and textiles. The state's economy transformed from one based primarily on agriculture to an industrial one, initially making use of water-power and later the steam engine to power factories. Canals and railroads were being used in the state for transporting raw materials and finished goods. At first, the new industries drew labor from Yankees on nearby subsistence farms, though they later relied upon immigrant labor from Europe and Canada.

Although Massachusetts was one of the first English colonies to legally institutionalize slavery in the early seventeenth century, the state ultimately transformed into a vital epicenter of progressivist and abolitionist activity in the decades leading up to the American Civil War. Furthermore, as secretary of the state board of education, Horace Mann championed systemic reforms that established the Massachusetts public school system as a national model. Henry David Thoreau and Ralph Waldo Emerson, both philosophers and writers from the state, also made major contributions to American philosophy. Furthermore, members of the transcendentalist movement within the state emphasized the importance of the natural world and emotion to humanity.

Although significant opposition to abolitionism existed early on in Massachusetts, resulting in anti-abolitionist riots between 1835 and 1837, abolitionist views there gradually increased throughout the next few decades. Abolitionists John Brown and Sojourner Truth lived in Springfield and Northampton, respectively, while Frederick Douglass lived in Boston and Susan B. Anthony in Adams. The works of such abolitionists contributed to Massachusetts's actions during the Civil War. Massachusetts was the first state to recruit, train, and arm a Black regiment with White officers, the 54th Massachusetts Infantry Regiment. In 1852, Massachusetts became the first state to pass compulsory education laws.

=== 20th century ===
The U.S. stock market experienced a steep decline in October 1929, marking the beginning of the Great Depression. The Boston Stock Exchange lost over 25 percent in two days. The BSE, nearly 100 years old at the time, had helped raise the capital that had funded many of the Commonwealth's factories, railroads, and businesses.

With the departure of several manufacturing companies, the state's industrial economy began to decline during the early 20th century. By the 1920s, competition from the American South and Midwest, followed by the Great Depression, led to the collapse of the three main industries in Massachusetts: textiles, shoemaking, and precision mechanics. This decline would continue into the latter half of the 20th century. Between 1950 and 1979, the number of Massachusetts residents involved in textile manufacturing declined from 264,000 to 63,000. The 1969 closure of the Springfield Armory, in particular, spurred an exodus of high-paying jobs from Western Massachusetts, which suffered greatly as it de-industrialized during the century's last 40 years.

Massachusetts manufactured 3.4 percent of total United States military armaments produced during World War II, ranking tenth among the 48 states. After the world war, the economy of eastern Massachusetts transformed from one based on heavy industry into a service-based economy. Government contracts, private investment, and research facilities led to a new and improved industrial climate, with reduced unemployment and increased per capita income. Suburbanization flourished, and by the 1970s, the Route 128/Interstate 95 corridor was dotted with high-tech companies who recruited graduates of the area's many elite institutions of higher education.

In 1987, the state received federal funding for the Central Artery/Tunnel Project. Commonly known as "the Big Dig", it was, at the time, the biggest federal highway project ever approved. The project included making the Central Artery, part of Interstate 93, into a tunnel under downtown Boston, in addition to the re-routing of several other major highways. The project was controversial, with numerous claims of graft and mismanagement, and with its initial cost of $2.5 billion finalized at over $15 billion. Nonetheless, the Big Dig changed the face of Downtown Boston and connected areas that were once divided by elevated highway. Much of the raised old Central Artery was replaced with the Rose Fitzgerald Kennedy Greenway. The project also improved traffic conditions along several routes.

==== Politicians ====
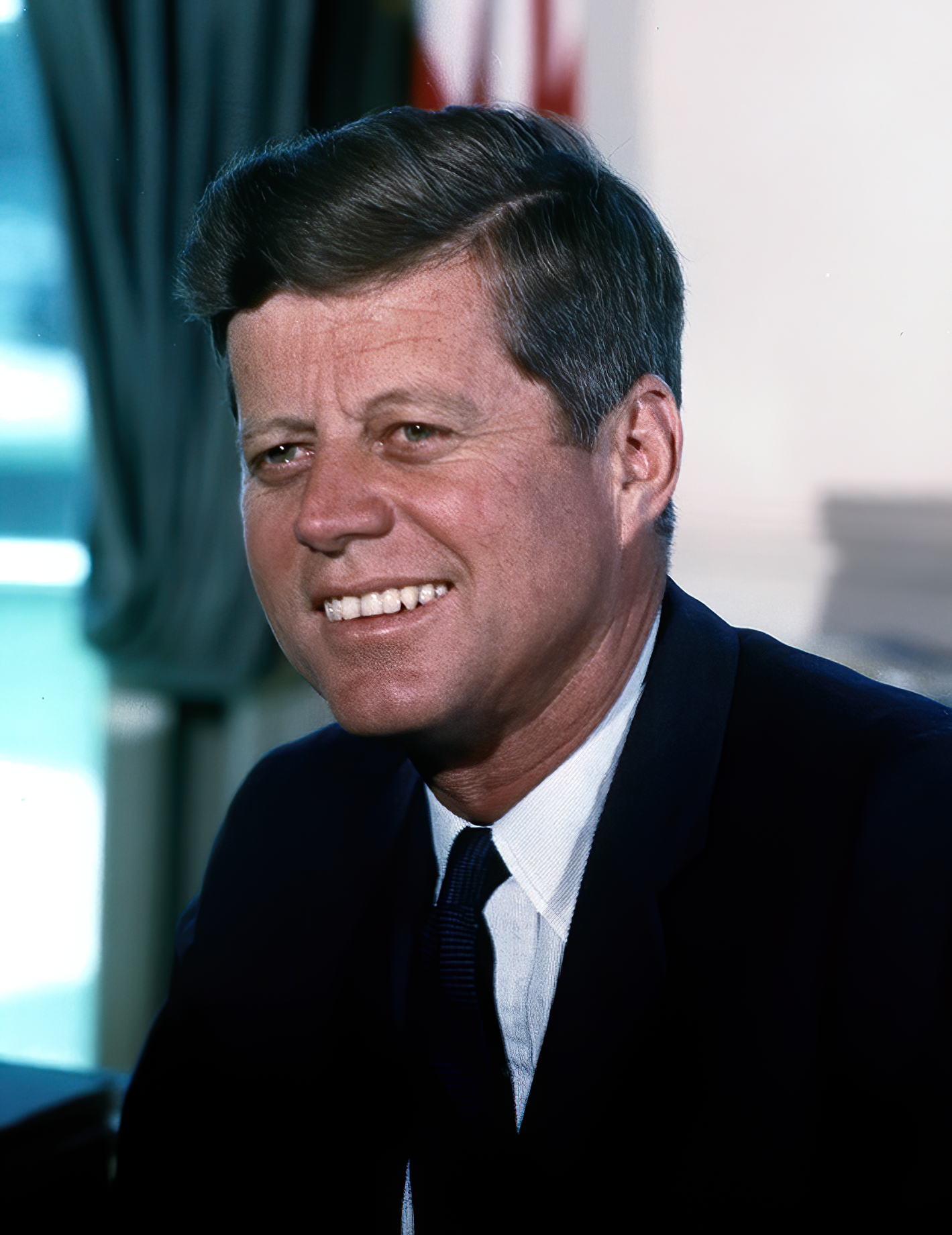
John F. Kennedy was a Massachusetts native, and 35th President of the United States from 1961 to 1963.

The Kennedy family was prominent in 20th-century Massachusetts politics. The children of businessman and ambassador Joseph P. Kennedy Sr. included John F. Kennedy, who was a senator and U.S. president before his assassination in 1963; Ted Kennedy, a senator from 1962 until his death in 2009; and Eunice Kennedy Shriver, a co-founder of the Special Olympics. In 1966, Massachusetts became the first state to directly elect an African American to the U.S. senate with Edward Brooke. George H. W. Bush, 41st President of the United States (1989–1993) was born in Milton in 1924.

Other Massachusetts politicians on the national level included Joseph W. Martin Jr., Speaker of the House (from 1947 to 1949 and 1953 to 1955) and leader of House Republicans from 1939 to 1959 (where he was the only Republican to serve as Speaker between 1931 and 1995), John W. McCormack, Speaker of the House in the 1960s, Michael Dukakis, three-term Governor and Democratic nominee in the 1992 presidential election, and Tip O'Neill, whose service as Speaker of the House from 1977 to 1987 was the longest continuous tenure in United States history.

=== 21st century ===
On May 17, 2004, Massachusetts became the first state in the U.S. to legalize same-sex marriage. This followed the Massachusetts Supreme Judicial Court's decision in Goodridge v. Department of Public Health in November 2003, which determined that the exclusion of same-sex couples from the right to a civil marriage was unconstitutional.

In 2004, Massachusetts senator John Kerry, who had won the Democratic nomination for President of the United States, lost to incumbent George W. Bush. Eight years later, former Massachusetts governor Mitt Romney (the Republican nominee) lost to incumbent Barack Obama in 2012. Another eight years later, Massachusetts senator Elizabeth Warren became a frontrunner in the Democratic primaries for the 2020 presidential election. However, she later suspended her campaign and endorsed presumptive nominee Joe Biden.

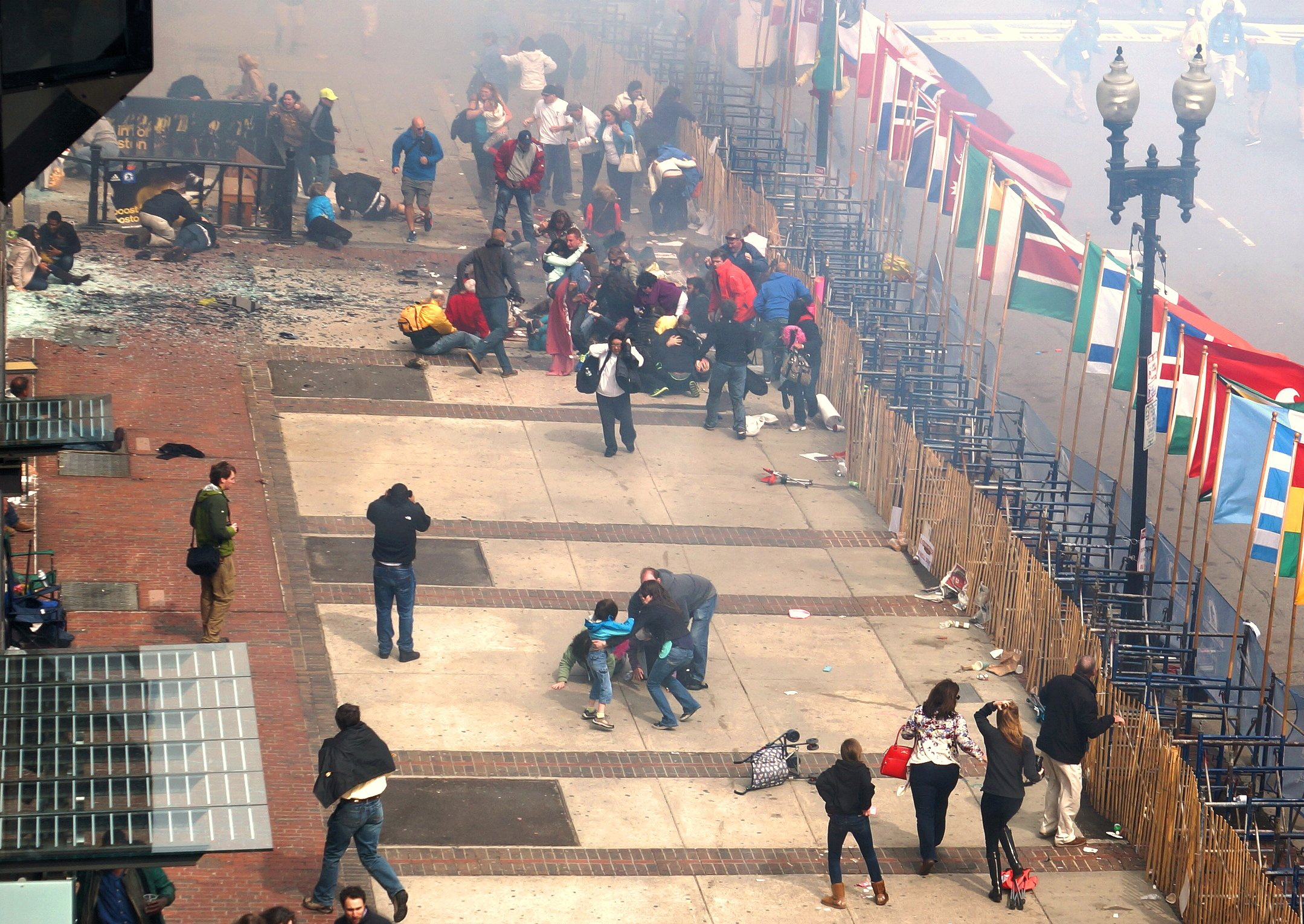
Boston Marathon bombing

Two pressure cooker bombs exploded near the finish line of the Boston Marathon on April 15, 2013, at around 2:49 pm local time (EDT). The explosions killed three people and injured an estimated 264 others. The Federal Bureau of Investigation (FBI) later identified the suspects as brothers Dzhokhar Tsarnaev and Tamerlan Tsarnaev. The ensuing manhunt ended on April 19 when thousands of law enforcement officers searched a 20-block area of nearby Watertown. Dzhokhar later said he was motivated by extremist Islamic beliefs and learned to build explosive devices from Inspire, the online magazine of al-Qaeda in the Arabian Peninsula.

On November 8, 2016, Massachusetts voted in favor of the Massachusetts Marijuana Legalization Initiative, also known as Question 4.

== Geography ==
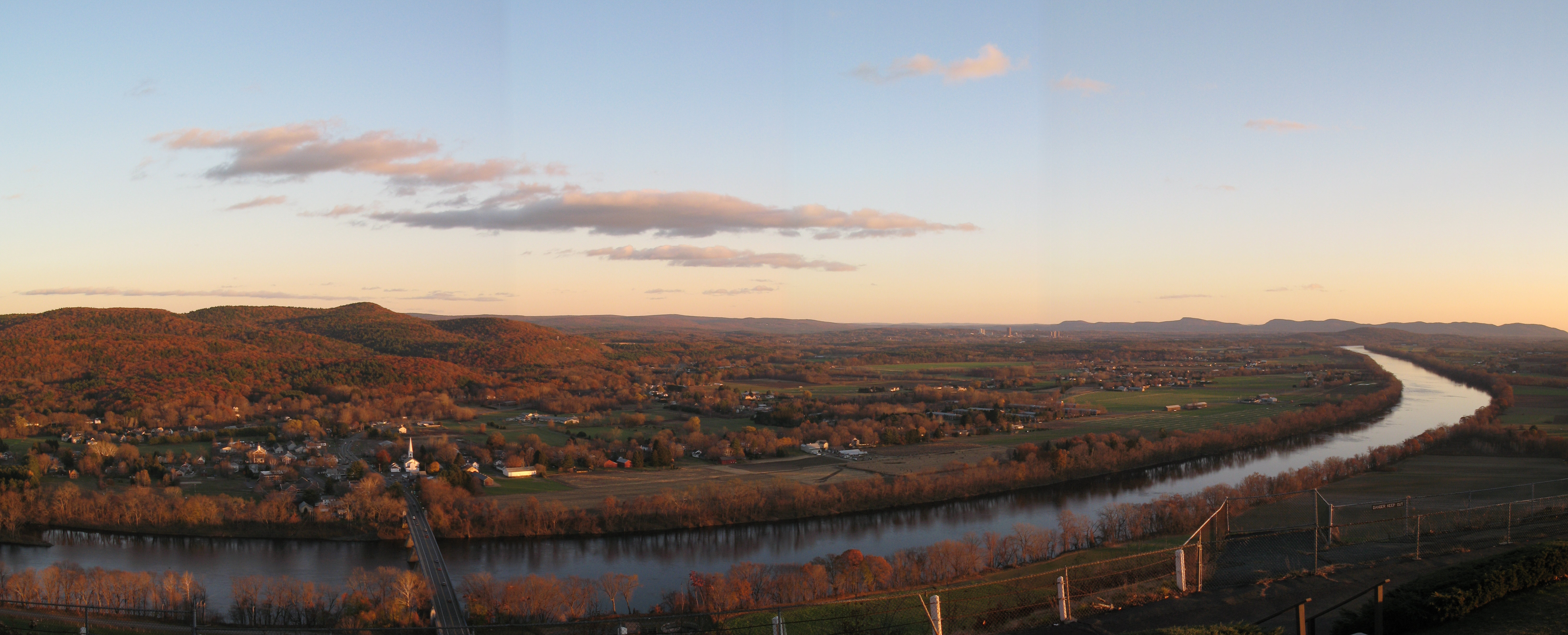
A portion of the north-central Pioneer Valley is in South Deerfield.

Massachusetts is the seventh-smallest state in the United States. It is located in the New England region of the Northeastern United States. It has an area of 10,555 square miles (27,340 km^{2}), 25.7% of which is water. Several large bays distinctly shape its coast, giving it the nickname "the Bay State". Boston is its largest city.

Despite its small size, Massachusetts features numerous topographically distinctive regions. The large coastal plain of the Atlantic Ocean in the eastern section of the state contains Greater Boston, along with most of the state's population, as well as the distinctive Cape Cod peninsula. To the west lies the hilly, rural region of Central Massachusetts, and beyond that, the Connecticut River Valley. Along the western border of Western Massachusetts lies the highest elevated part of the state, the Berkshires, forming a portion of the northern terminus of the Appalachian Mountains.

The U.S. National Park Service administers a number of natural and historical sites in Massachusetts. Along with twelve national historic sites, areas, and corridors, the National Park Service also manages the Cape Cod National Seashore and the Boston Harbor Islands National Recreation Area. In addition, the Department of Conservation and Recreation maintains a number of parks, trails, and beaches throughout Massachusetts.

=== Ecology ===
The primary biome of inland Massachusetts is temperate deciduous forest. Although much of Massachusetts had been cleared for agriculture, leaving only traces of old-growth forest in isolated pockets, secondary growth has regenerated in many rural areas as farms have been abandoned. Forests cover around 62% of Massachusetts. The areas most affected by human development include the Greater Boston area in the east and the Springfield metropolitan area in the west, although the latter includes agricultural areas throughout the Connecticut River Valley. There are 219 endangered species in Massachusetts.

A number of species are doing well in the increasingly urbanized Massachusetts. Peregrine falcons utilize office towers in larger cities as nesting areas, and the population of coyotes, whose diet may include garbage and roadkill, has been increasing in recent decades. White-tailed deer, raccoons, wild turkeys, and eastern gray squirrels are also found throughout Massachusetts. In more rural areas in the western part of Massachusetts, larger mammals such as moose and black bears have returned, largely due to reforestation following the regional decline in agriculture.

Massachusetts is located along the Atlantic Flyway, a major route for migratory waterfowl along the eastern coast. Lakes in central Massachusetts provide habitat for many species of fish and waterfowl, but some species such as the common loon are becoming rare. A significant population of long-tailed ducks winter off Nantucket. Small offshore islands and beaches are home to roseate terns and are important breeding areas for the locally threatened piping plover. Protected areas such as the Monomoy National Wildlife Refuge provide critical breeding habitat for shorebirds and a variety of marine wildlife including a large population of grey seals. Since 2009, there has been a significant increase in the number of Great white sharks spotted and tagged in the coastal waters off of Cape Cod.

Freshwater fish species in Massachusetts include bass, carp, catfish, and trout, while saltwater species such as Atlantic cod, haddock, and American lobster populate offshore waters. Other marine species include Harbor seals, the endangered North Atlantic right whales, as well as humpback whales, fin whales, minke whales, and Atlantic white-sided dolphins.

The European corn borer, a significant agricultural pest, was first found in North America near Boston in 1917.

=== Climate ===
Most of Massachusetts has a humid continental climate, with cold winters and warm summers. The far southeastern coastal areas form a broad transition zone into a humid subtropical climate. The warm to hot summers render the oceanic climate rare in this transition, only applying to exposed coastal areas such as on the peninsula of Barnstable County. The climate of Boston is quite representative for the commonwealth, characterized by summer highs of around 81 °F (27 °C) and winter highs of 35 °F (2 °C), and is quite wet. Frosts are frequent all winter, even in coastal areas due to prevailing inland winds. Boston has a relatively sunny climate for a coastal city at its latitude, averaging over 2,600 hours of sunshine a year.

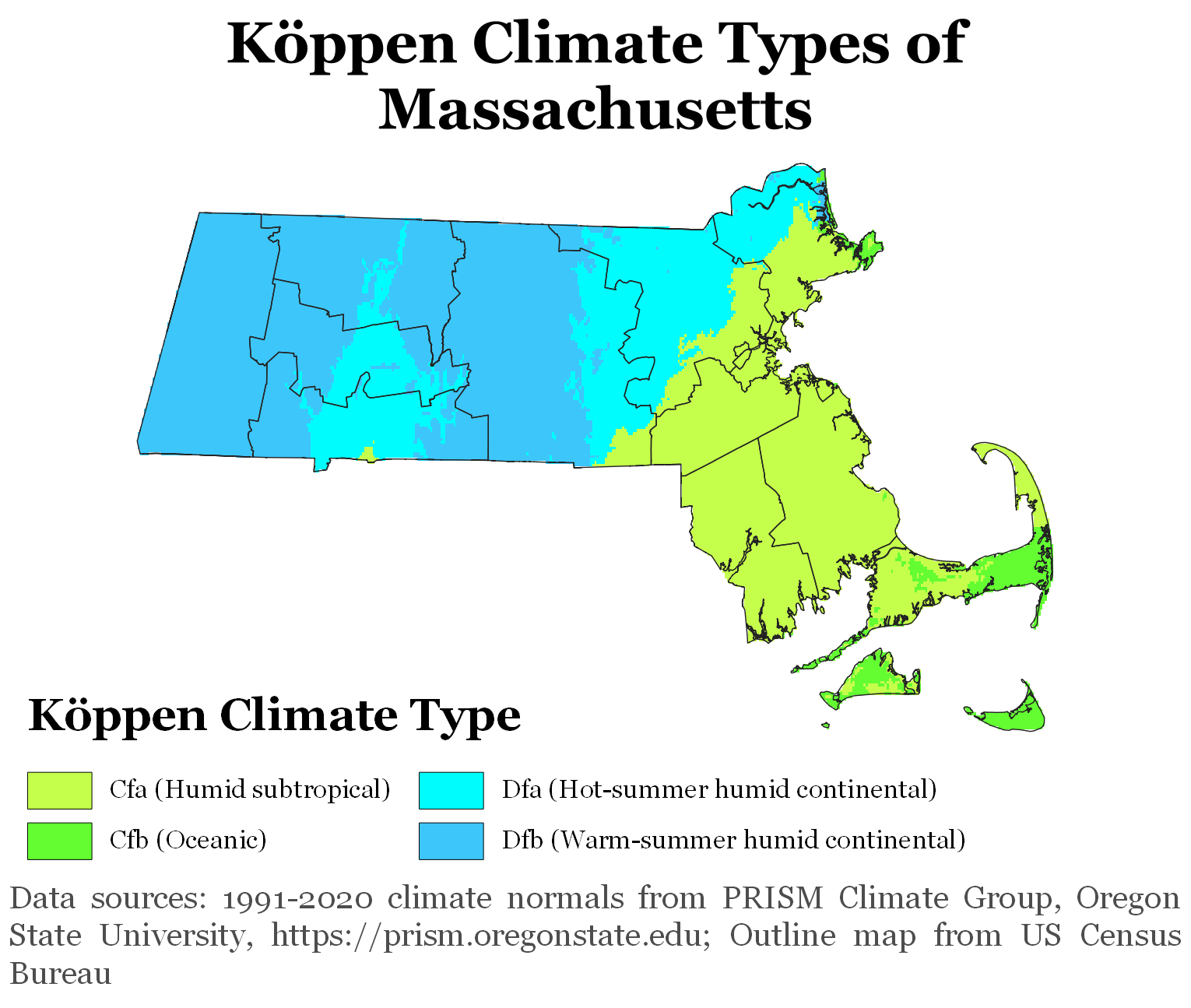
Koppen climate types of Massachusetts

Average daily maximum and minimum temperatures for selected cities in Massachusetts
Location	July (°F)	July (°C)	January (°F)	January (°C)
Boston	81/65	27/18	36/22	2/−5
Worcester	79/61	26/16	31/17	0/−8
Springfield	84/62	27/17	34/17	1/−8
New Bedford	80/65	26/18	37/23	3/−4
Quincy	80/61	26/16	33/18	1/−7
Plymouth	80/61	27/16	38/20	3/−6

=== Climate change ===
Climate change in Massachusetts is affecting both urban and rural environments, including forestry, fisheries, agriculture, and coastal development. The Northeast is projected to warm faster than global average temperatures; by 2035, according to the U.S. Global Change Research Program, the Northeast is "projected to be more than 3.6°F (2°C) warmer on average than during the preindustrial era". As of August 2016, the EPA reports that Massachusetts has warmed by over two degrees Fahrenheit, or 1.1 degrees Celsius.

Shifting temperatures also result in the shifting of rainfall patterns and the intensification of precipitation events. To that end, average precipitation in the Northeast United States has risen by ten percent from 1895 to 2011, and the number of heavy precipitation events has increased by seventy percent during that time. These increased precipitation patterns are focused in the winter and spring. Increasing temperatures coupled with increasing precipitation will result in earlier snow melts and subsequent drier soil in the summer months.

The shifting climate in Massachusetts will result in a significant change to the state's built environment and ecosystems. In Boston alone, costs of climate change-related storms will result in $5 to $100 billion in damage.

Warmer temperatures will also disrupt bird migration and flora blooming. With these changes, deer populations are expected to increase, resulting in a decrease in underbrush which smaller fauna use as camouflage. Additionally, rising temperatures will increase the number of reported Lyme disease cases in the state. Ticks can transmit the disease once temperatures reach 45 degrees, so shorter winters will increase the window of transmission. These warmer temperatures will also increase the prevalence of Asian tiger mosquitoes, which often carry the West Nile virus.

To fight this change, the Massachusetts Executive Office of Energy and Environmental Affairs has outlined a path to decarbonize the state's economy. On April 22, 2020, Kathleen A. Theoharides, the state's Secretary of Energy and Environmental Affairs, released a Determination of Statewide Emissions limits for 2050. In her letter, Theoharides stresses that as of 2020, the Commonwealth has experienced property damage attributable to climate change of more than $60 billion. To ensure that the Commonwealth experiences warming no more than 1.5 °C of pre-industrialization levels, the state will work towards two goals by 2050: to achieve net-zero emissions, and to reduce greenhouse gas emissions by 85 percent overall.

== Demographics ==
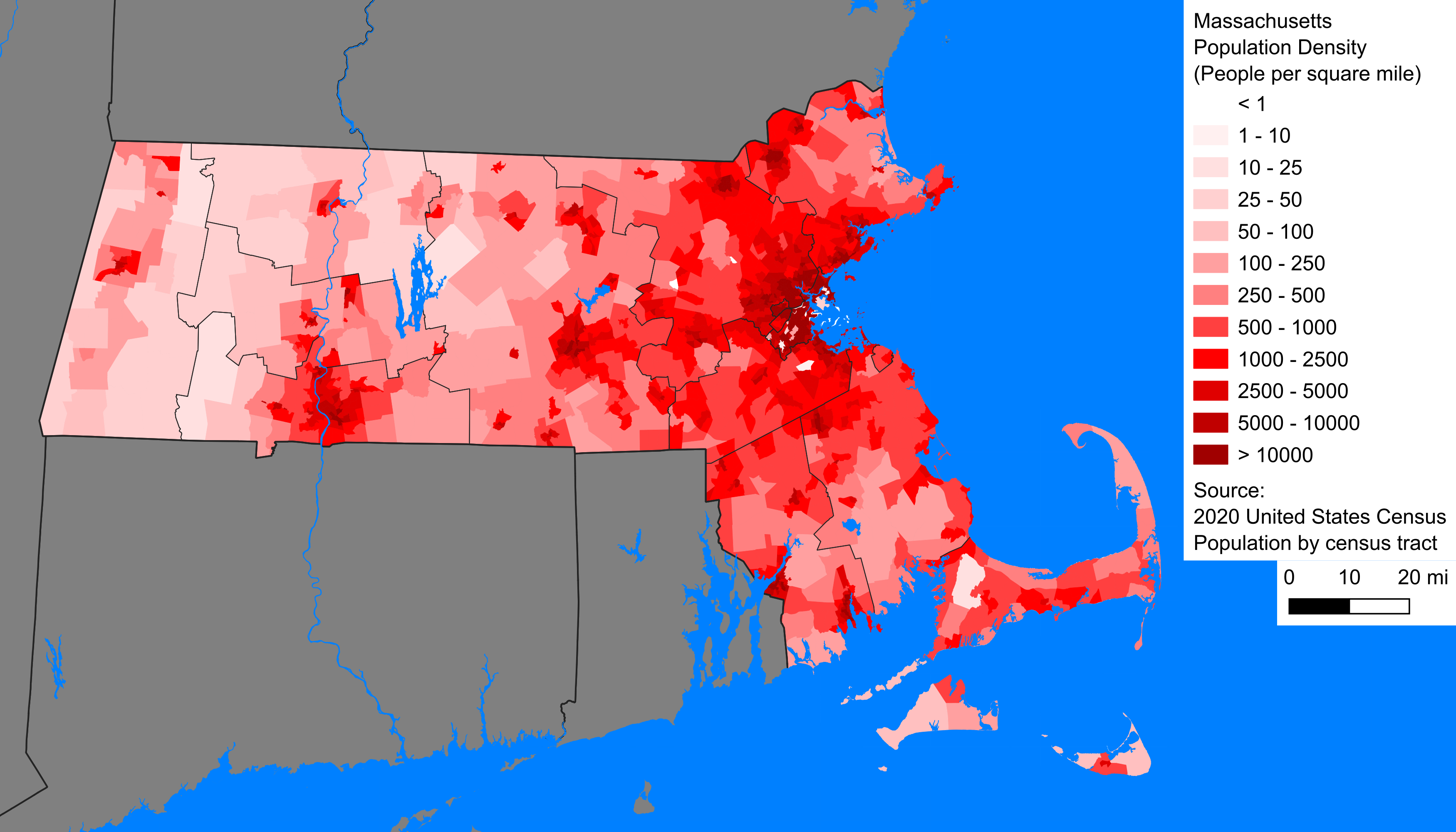
Massachusetts population density map. The centers of high-density settlement, from east to west, are Boston, Worcester, Springfield, and Pittsfield, respectively.

Historical population
Census	Pop.	Note	%±
1790	378,787		—
1800	422,845		11.6%
1810	472,040		11.6%
1820	523,287		10.9%
1830	610,408		16.6%
1840	737,699		20.9%
1850	994,514		34.8%
1860	1,231,066		23.8%
1870	1,457,351		18.4%
1880	1,783,085		22.4%
1890	2,238,947		25.6%
1900	2,805,346		25.3%
1910	3,366,416		20.0%
1920	3,852,356		14.4%
1930	4,249,614		10.3%
1940	4,316,721		1.6%
1950	4,690,514		8.7%
1960	5,148,578		9.8%
1970	5,689,170		10.5%
1980	5,737,037		0.8%
1990	6,016,425		4.9%
2000	6,349,097		5.5%
2010	6,547,629		3.1%
2020	7,029,917		7.4%
2025 (est.)	7,154,084		1.8%

At the 2020 U.S. census, Massachusetts had a population of over 7 million, a 7.4% increase since the previous census. As of 2015, Massachusetts was estimated to be the third-most densely populated U.S. state, with 871.0 people per square mile, behind New Jersey and Rhode Island. In 2014, Massachusetts had 1,011,811 foreign-born residents or 15% of the population. As of July 2024, the state's population was estimated to have grown to 7,136,171.

Most Massachusetts residents live within the Boston metropolitan area, also known as Greater Boston, which includes Boston and its proximate surroundings but also extending to Greater Lowell and to Worcester. The Springfield metropolitan area, also known as Greater Springfield, is also a major center of population. Demographically, the center of population of Massachusetts is located in the town of Natick.

Like the rest of the Northeastern United States, the population of Massachusetts has continued to grow in the late 20th and early 21st centuries. Massachusetts is the fastest-growing state in New England and the 25th fastest-growing state in the United States. Population growth has been driven primarily by the relatively high quality of life and a large higher education system.

Foreign immigration is also a factor in the state's population growth, causing the state's population to continue to grow as of the 2010 census (particularly in Massachusetts gateway cities where costs of living are lower). Forty percent of foreign immigrants were from Central or South America, according to a 2005 Census Bureau study, with many of the remainder from Asia. Many residents who have settled in Greater Springfield claim Puerto Rican descent. Many areas of Massachusetts showed relatively stable population trends between 2000 and 2010. Exurban Boston and coastal areas grew the most rapidly, while Berkshire County in far Western Massachusetts and Barnstable County on Cape Cod were the only counties to lose population as of the 2010 census. In 2018, the top countries of origin for Massachusetts's immigrants were China, the Dominican Republic, Brazil, India and Haiti.

By sex, 48.4% were male, and 51.6% were female in 2014. In terms of age, 79.2% were over 18 and 14.8% were over 65.

According to HUD's 2022 Annual Homeless Assessment Report, there were an estimated 15,507 homeless people in Massachusetts.

=== Race and ancestry ===
The state's most populous ethnic group, non-Hispanic white, has declined from 95.4% in 1970 to 67.6% in 2020.

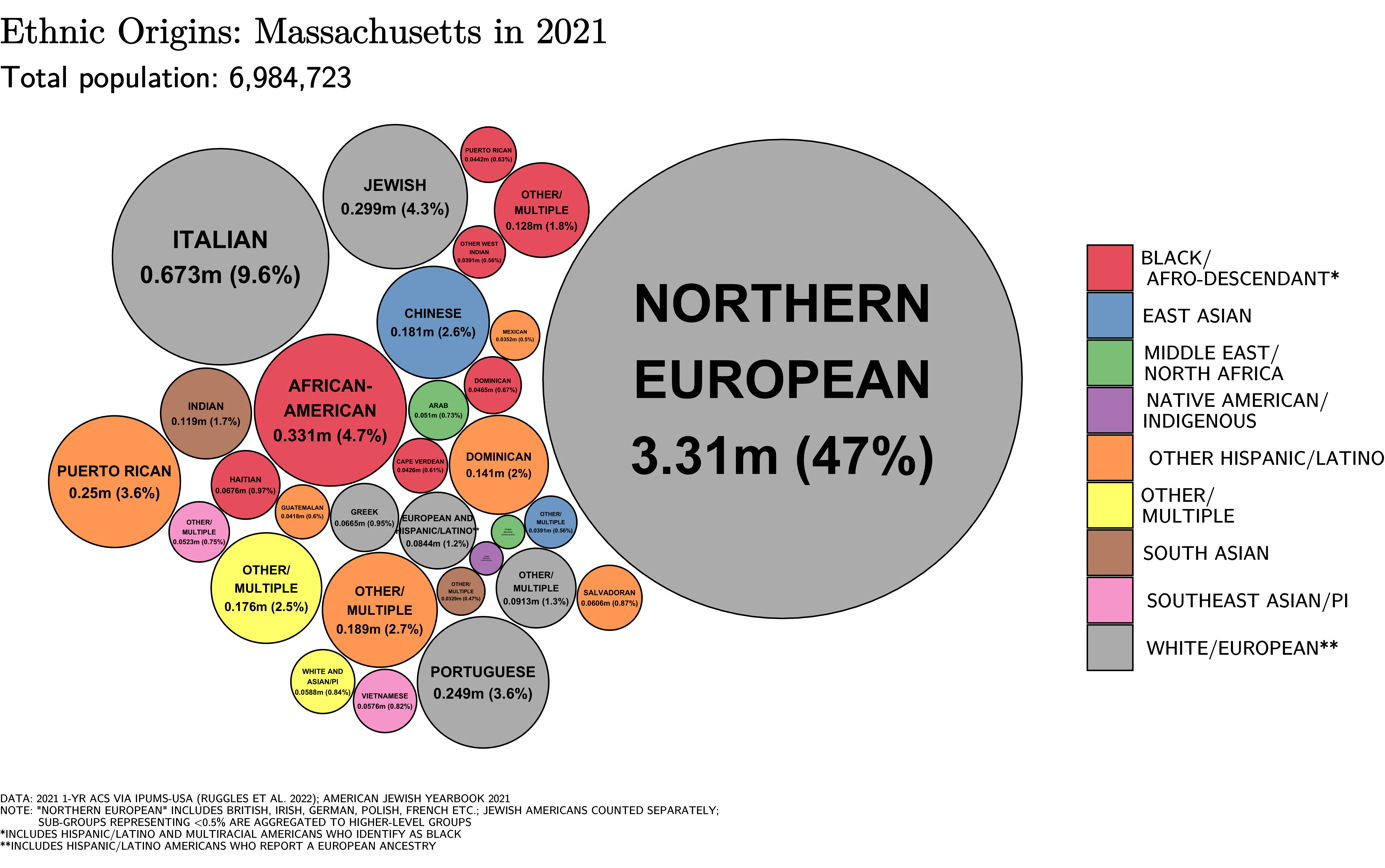
Ethnic origins in Massachusetts

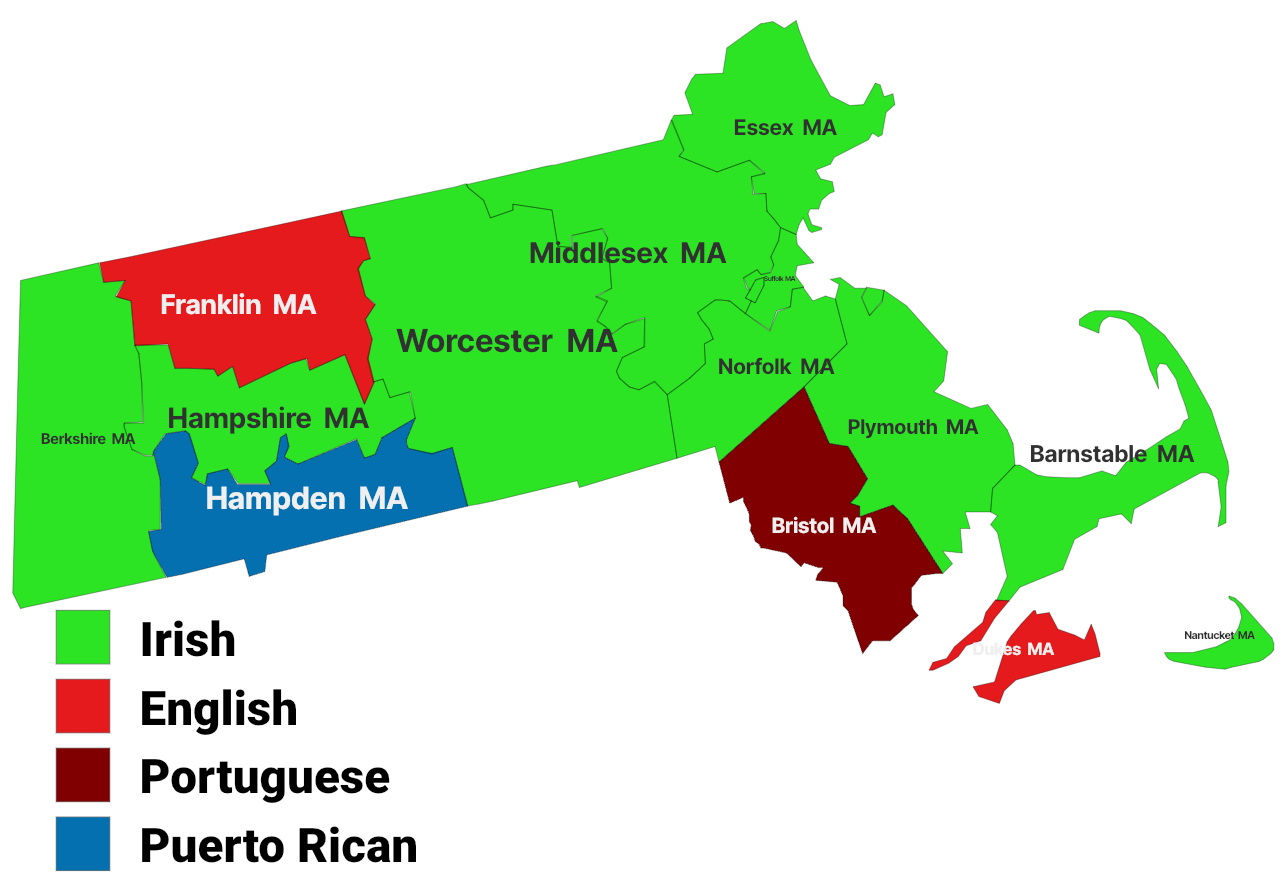
Largest alone or in any combination ethnic origin by county in Massachusetts, per the 2020 census

As of 2011, non-Hispanic whites were involved in 63.6% of all the births, while 36.4% of the population of Massachusetts younger than age 1 was minorities (at least one parent who was not non-Hispanic white). One major reason for this is that non-Hispanic whites in Massachusetts recorded a total fertility rate of 1.36 in 2017, the second-lowest in the country after neighboring Rhode Island.

Ethnic composition as of the 2020 census
Race and Ethnicity	Alone	Total
White (non-Hispanic)	67.6%	71.4%
Hispanic or Latino (Note: Persons of Hispanic or Latino origin are not distinguished between total and partial ancestry.)	—	12.6%
African American (non-Hispanic)	6.5%	8.2%
Asian	7.2%	8.2%
Native American	0.1%	0.9%
Pacific Islander	0.02%	0.1%
Other	1.3%	3.6%

=== 2020 census ===
Massachusetts – Racial and ethnic composition Note: the US Census treats Hispanic/Latino as an ethnic category. This table excludes Latinos from the racial categories and assigns them to a separate category. Hispanics/Latinos may be of any race.
Race / Ethnicity (NH = Non-Hispanic)	Pop 1980	Pop 1990	Pop 2000	Pop 2010	Pop 2020	% 1980	% 1990	% 2000	% 2010	% 2020
White alone (NH)	5,294,151	5,280,292	5,198,359	4,984,800	4,748,897	92.28%	87.76%	81.88%	76.13%	67.55%
Black or African American alone (NH)	213,615	274,464	318,329	391,693	457,055	3.72%	4.56%	5.01%	5.98%	6.50%
Native American or Alaska Native alone (NH)	7,743	10,545	11,264	10,778	9,387	0.13%	0.18%	0.18%	0.16%	0.13%
Asian alone (NH)	49,501	140,338	236,786	347,495	504,900	0.86%	2.33%	3.73%	5.31%	7.18%
Native Hawaiian or Pacific Islander alone (NH)	x	x	1,706	1,467	1,607	x	x	0.03%	0.02%	0.02%
Other race alone (NH)	30,984	23,237	43,586	61,547	92,108	0.54%	0.39%	0.69%	0.94%	1.31%
Mixed race or Multiracial (NH)	x	x	110,338	122,195	328,278	x	x	1.74%	1.87%	4.67%
Hispanic or Latino (any race)	141,043	287,549	428,729	627,654	887,685	2.46%	4.78%	6.75%	9.59%	12.63%
Total	5,737,037	6,016,425	6,349,097	6,547,629	7,029,917	100.00%	100.00%	100.00%	100.00%	100.00%

As late as 1795, the population of Massachusetts was nearly 95% of English ancestry. During the early and mid-19th century, immigrant groups began arriving in Massachusetts in large numbers; first from Ireland in the 1840s; today the Irish are the largest ancestry group in the state at nearly 20% of the total population. Others arrived later from Quebec as well as places in Europe such as Italy, Portugal, and Poland. In the early 20th century, a large percentage of black immigrants were from the Caribbean island of Barbados, and mostly settled in Cambridge and Boston's South End. In the Great Migration of 1910 to 1970, African Americans migrated to Massachusetts, although in somewhat fewer numbers than many other northern states. Later in the 20th century, immigration from Latin America increased considerably. More than 156,000 Chinese Americans made their home in Massachusetts in 2014, and Boston hosts a growing Chinatown accommodating heavily traveled Chinese-owned bus lines to and from Chinatown, Manhattan in New York City. Massachusetts also has large Dominican, Puerto Rican, Haitian, Cape Verdean and Brazilian populations. Boston's South End and Jamaica Plain are both gay villages, as is nearby Provincetown, Massachusetts on Cape Cod.

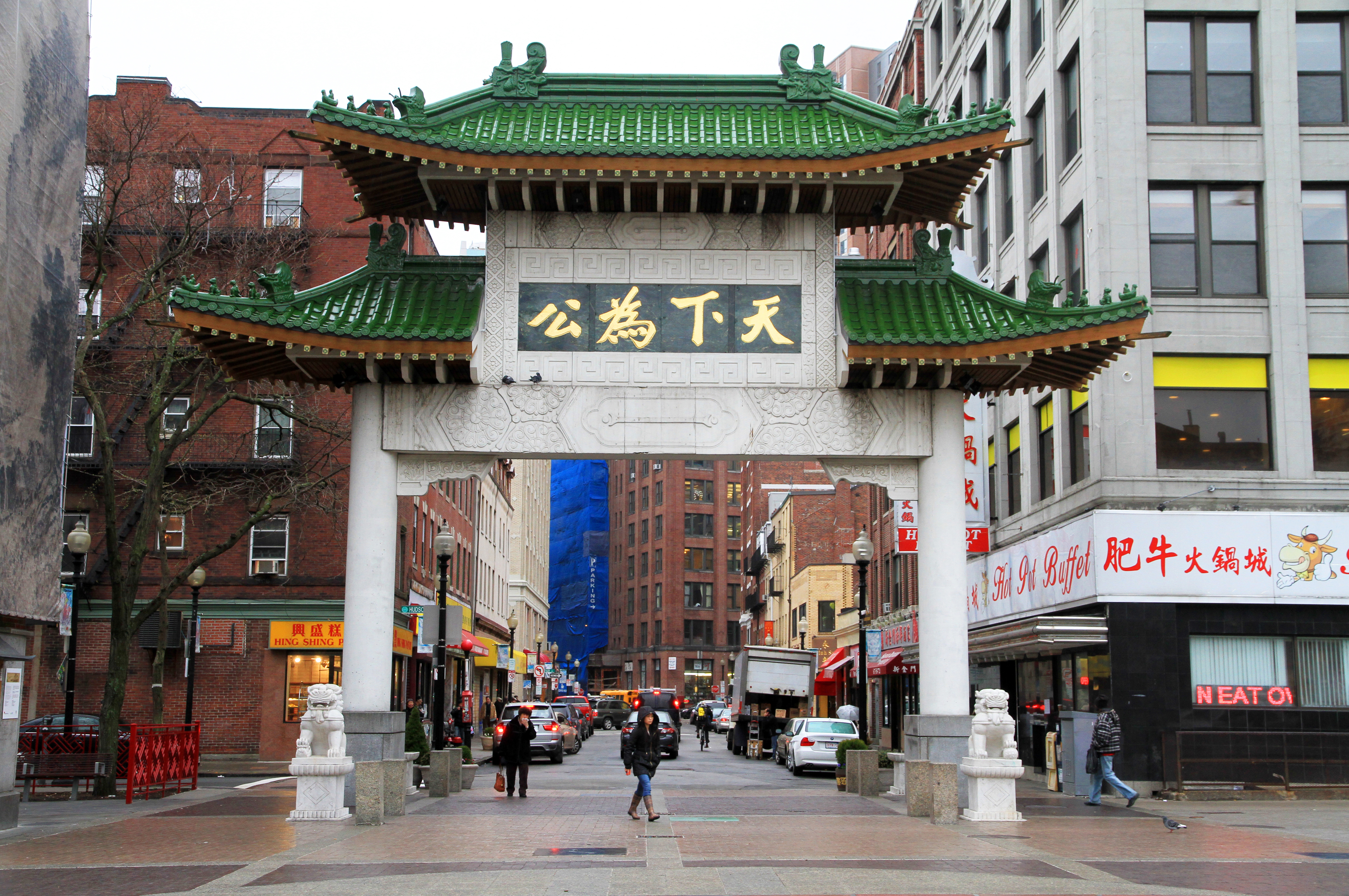
Boston's Chinatown has a paifang entrance gate, and is home to many Chinese and Vietnamese people.

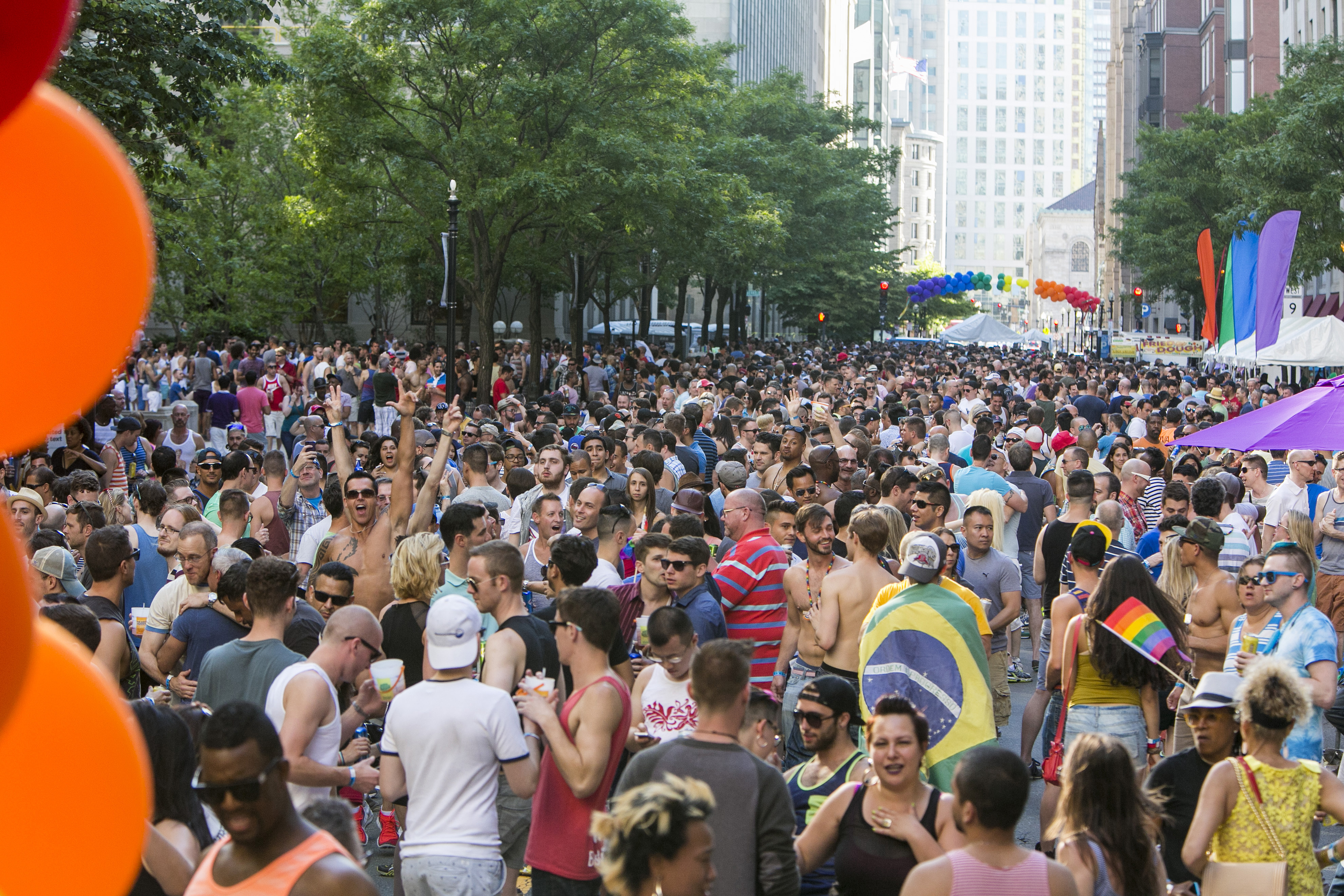
Boston's gay pride march is held annually in June. In 2004, Massachusetts became the first U.S. state to legalize same-sex marriage.

The largest ancestry group in Massachusetts are the Irish, at 19% of the population, who live in significant numbers throughout the state but form more than 40% of the population along the South Shore in Norfolk and Plymouth counties. In both counties overall, Irish-Americans comprise around 25% of the population.

Italians form the second-largest ethnic group in the state (10.8%), but form a plurality in some suburbs north of Boston and in a few towns in the Berkshires. English Americans, the third-largest (9.2%) group, form a plurality in some western towns. French and French Canadians also form a significant part (7.2%), with sizable populations in Bristol, Hampden, and Worcester Counties, along with Middlesex county especially concentrated in the areas surrounding Lowell and Lawrence. Lowell is home to the second-largest Cambodian community of the nation. Massachusetts is home to a small community of Greek Americans as well, which according to the American Community Survey there are 61,234 of them scattered along the state (0.9% of the total state population). In Watertown, there is a significant minority population of Armenian Americans. There are also several populations of Native Americans in Massachusetts. The Wampanoag tribe maintains reservations at Aquinnah on Martha's Vineyard and at Mashpee on Cape Cod—with an ongoing native language revival project underway since 1993, while the Nipmuc maintain two state-recognized reservations in the central part of the state, including one at Grafton.

Massachusetts has avoided many forms of racial strife seen elsewhere in the US, but examples such as the successful electoral showings of the nativist (mainly anti-Catholic) Know Nothings in the 1850s, the controversial Sacco and Vanzetti executions in the 1920s, and Boston's opposition to desegregation busing in the 1970s.

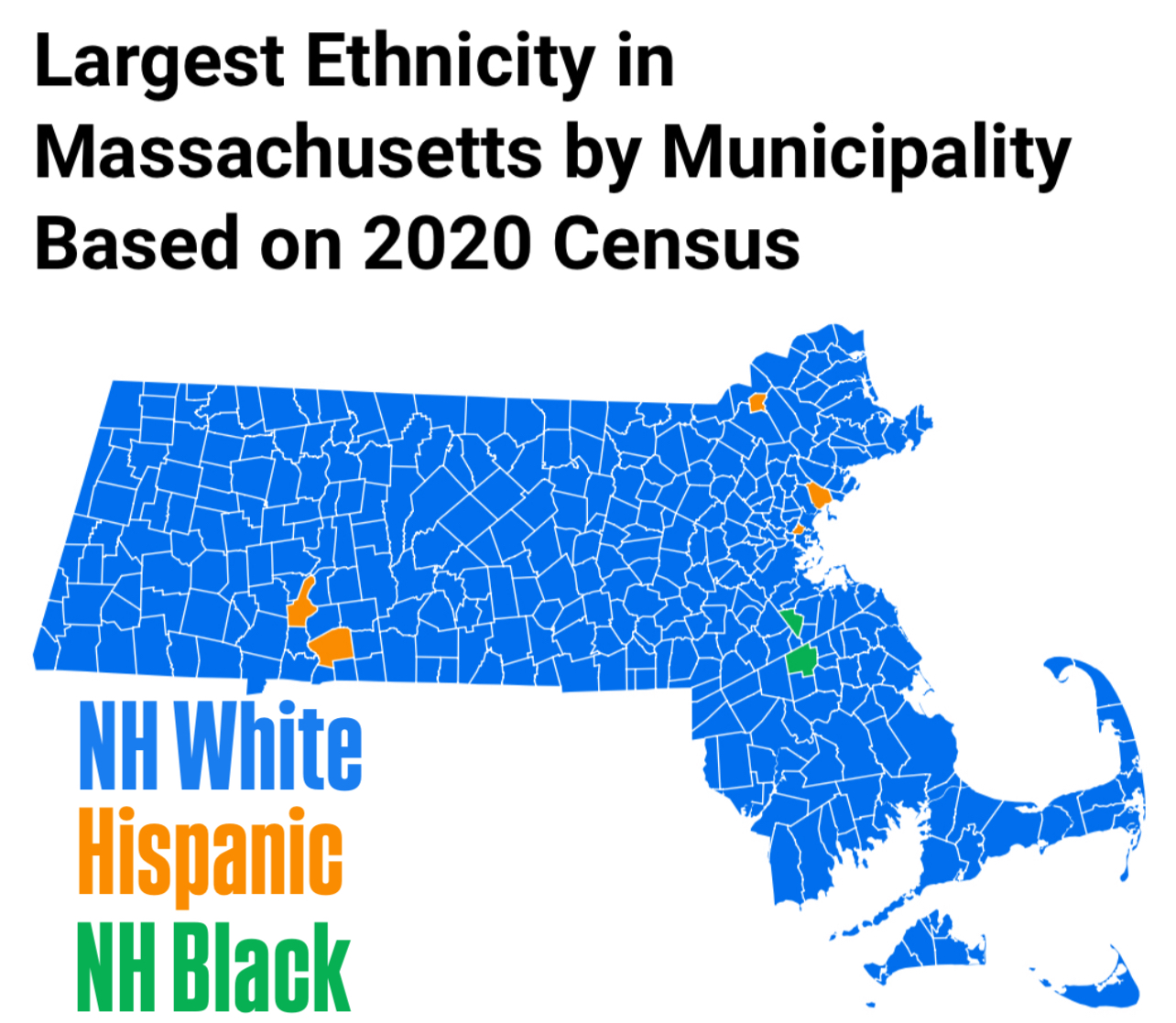
Largest Ethnicity in Massachusetts by Municipality Based on 2020 Census

The US Census treats Hispanic/Latino as an ethnic category. This table excludes Latinos from the racial categories and assigns them to a separate category. Hispanics/Latinos may be of any race, and "NH" means "Non-Hispanic".

=== Languages ===
The most common varieties of American English spoken in Massachusetts, other than General American, are the cot-caught distinct, rhotic, western Massachusetts dialect and the cot-caught merged, non-rhotic, eastern Massachusetts dialect which is popularly known as a "Boston accent".

Top 11 Non-English Languages Spoken in Massachusetts
Language	Percentage of pop. as of 2010
Spanish	7.50%
Portuguese	2.97%
Chinese (including Cantonese and Mandarin)	1.59%
French (including New England French)	1.11%
French Creole	0.89%
Italian	0.72%
Russian	0.62%
Vietnamese	0.58%
Greek	0.41%
Arabic and Khmer (Cambodian) (including all Austroasiatic languages) (tied)	0.37%

As of 2010, 78.93% (4,823,127) of Massachusetts residents 5 and older spoke English at home as a first language, while 7.50% (458,256) spoke Spanish, 2.97% (181,437) Portuguese, 1.59% (96,690) Chinese (which includes Cantonese and Mandarin), 1.11% (67,788) French, 0.89% (54,456) French Creole, 0.72% (43,798) Italian, 0.62% (37,865) Russian, and Vietnamese was spoken as a primary language by 0.58% (35,283) of the population over 5. In total, 21.07% (1,287,419) of Massachusetts's population 5 and older spoke a first language other than English.

=== Religion ===
Religious self-identification, per Public Religion Research Institute's 2022 American Values Survey
1. Unaffiliated (34.0%)
2. Catholicism (34.0%)
3. Protestantism (22.0%)
4. Eastern Orthodoxy (1.00%)
5. Unitarian/Universalist (1.00%)
6. Judaism (3.00%)
7. Hinduism (2.00%)
8. Buddhism (1.00%)
9. New Age (1.00%)
10. Other (1.00%)

Massachusetts was founded and settled by Brownist Puritans in 1620, and soon after by other groups of Separatists/Dissenters, Nonconformists and Independents from 17th century England. A majority of people in Massachusetts today remain Christians. The descendants of the Puritans belong to many different churches; in the direct line of inheritance are the various Congregational churches, the United Church of Christ and congregations of the Unitarian Universalist Association. The headquarters of the Unitarian Universalist Association, long located on Beacon Hill, is now located in South Boston. Many Puritan descendants also dispersed to other Protestant denominations. Some disaffiliated along with Roman Catholics and other Christian groups in the wake of modern secularization.

As of the 2014 Pew study, Christians made up 57% of the state's population, with Protestants making up 21% of them. Roman Catholics made up 34% and now predominate because of massive immigration from primarily Catholic countries and regions—chiefly Ireland, Italy, Poland, Portugal, Quebec, and Latin America. Both Protestant and Roman Catholic communities have been in decline since the late 20th century, due to the rise of irreligion in New England. It is the most irreligious region of the country, along with the Western United States; for comparison and contrast however, in 2020, the Public Religion Research Institute determined 67% of the population were Christian reflecting a slight increase of religiosity. A significant Jewish population immigrated to the Boston and Springfield areas between 1880 and 1920. Jews make up 3% of the population. Mary Baker Eddy made the Boston Mother Church of Christian Science serve as the world headquarters of this new religious movement. Buddhists, Pagans, Hindus, Seventh-day Adventists, Muslims, and Mormons may also be found. The Satanic Temple has its headquarters in Salem. Kripalu Center in Stockbridge, the Shaolin Meditation Temple in Springfield, and the Insight Meditation Center in Barre are examples of non-Abrahamic religious centers in Massachusetts. According to 2010 data from The Association of Religion Data Archives, (ARDA) the largest single denominations are the Catholic Church with 2,940,199 adherents; the United Church of Christ with 86,639 adherents; and the Episcopal Church with 81,999 adherents.

In 2014, 32% of the population identified as having no religion; in a separate 2020 study, 23% of the population identified as irreligious, and 67% of the population identified as Christians (including 26% as white Protestants and 20% as white Catholics). As of 2022, a plurality of Massachusettsans were irreligious, and the state is considered to be a part of the Unchurched Belt.

=== Native American tribes ===
What became Massachusetts was originally inhabited by the Wampanoag, the Nipmuc, the Massachusett, the Pocumtuc, the Nauset, the Pennacook, and a few other tribes. Some of these tribes are still represented among the population of the state.

The largest Native American tribes in Massachusetts according to the 2010 census are listed in this table.

Tribal groupings with over 600 members in Massachusetts in 2010 census
Tribal grouping	American Indian and Alaska Native alone	AIAN in combination with other races	Total AIAN, any combination
Total AIAN population	18850	31855	50705
Cherokee	885	3654	4539
Wampanoag	1674	1642	3316
Micmac	623	1166	1789
South American Indian	817	930	1747
Blackfeet	298	1347	1645
Mexican American Indian	1131	449	1580
Iroquois	457	984	1441
Central American Indian	635	332	967
Nipmuc	305	550	855
Abenaki	197	469	666
Sioux	186	463	649
Tribe not specified	9421	16535	25956

== Education ==
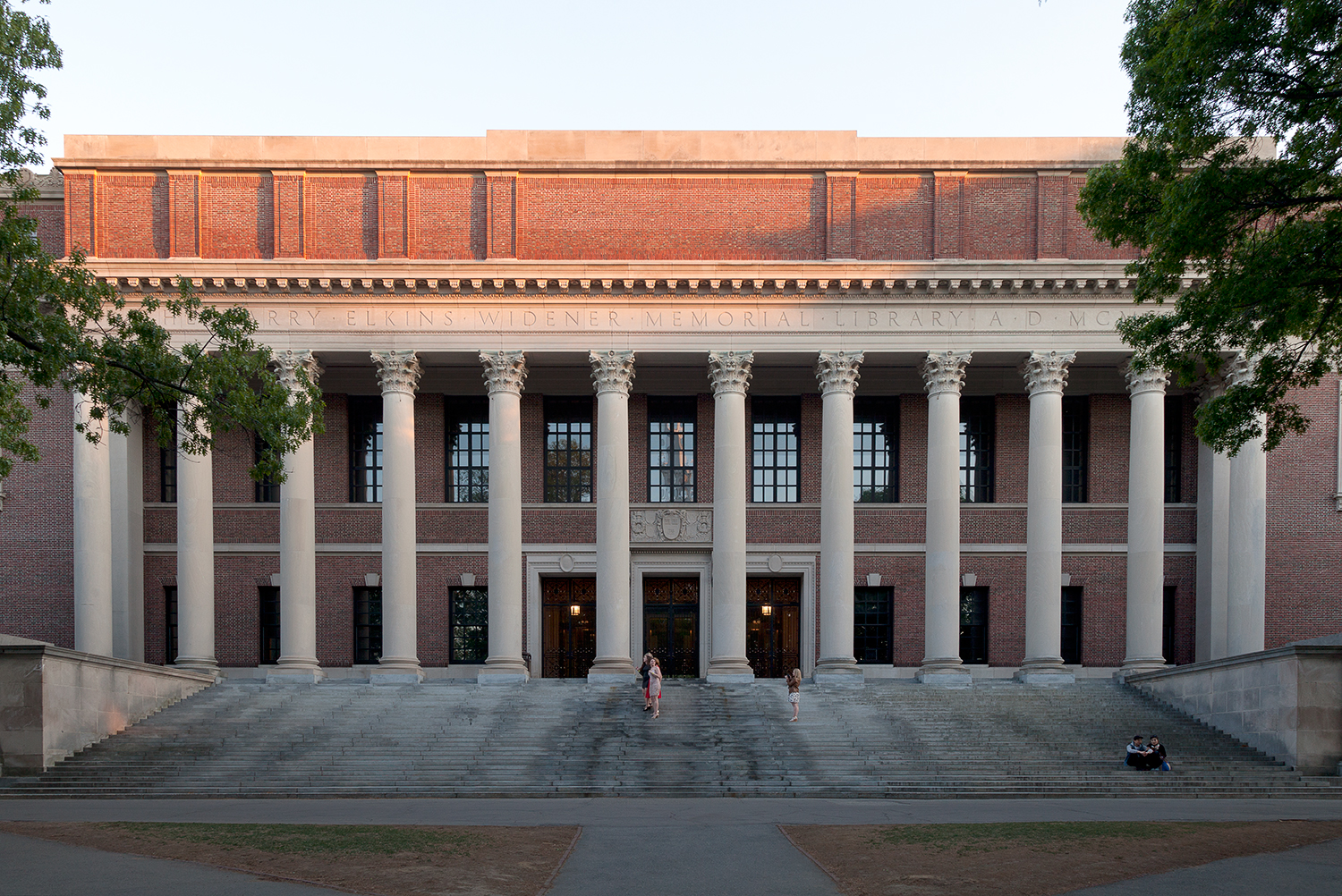
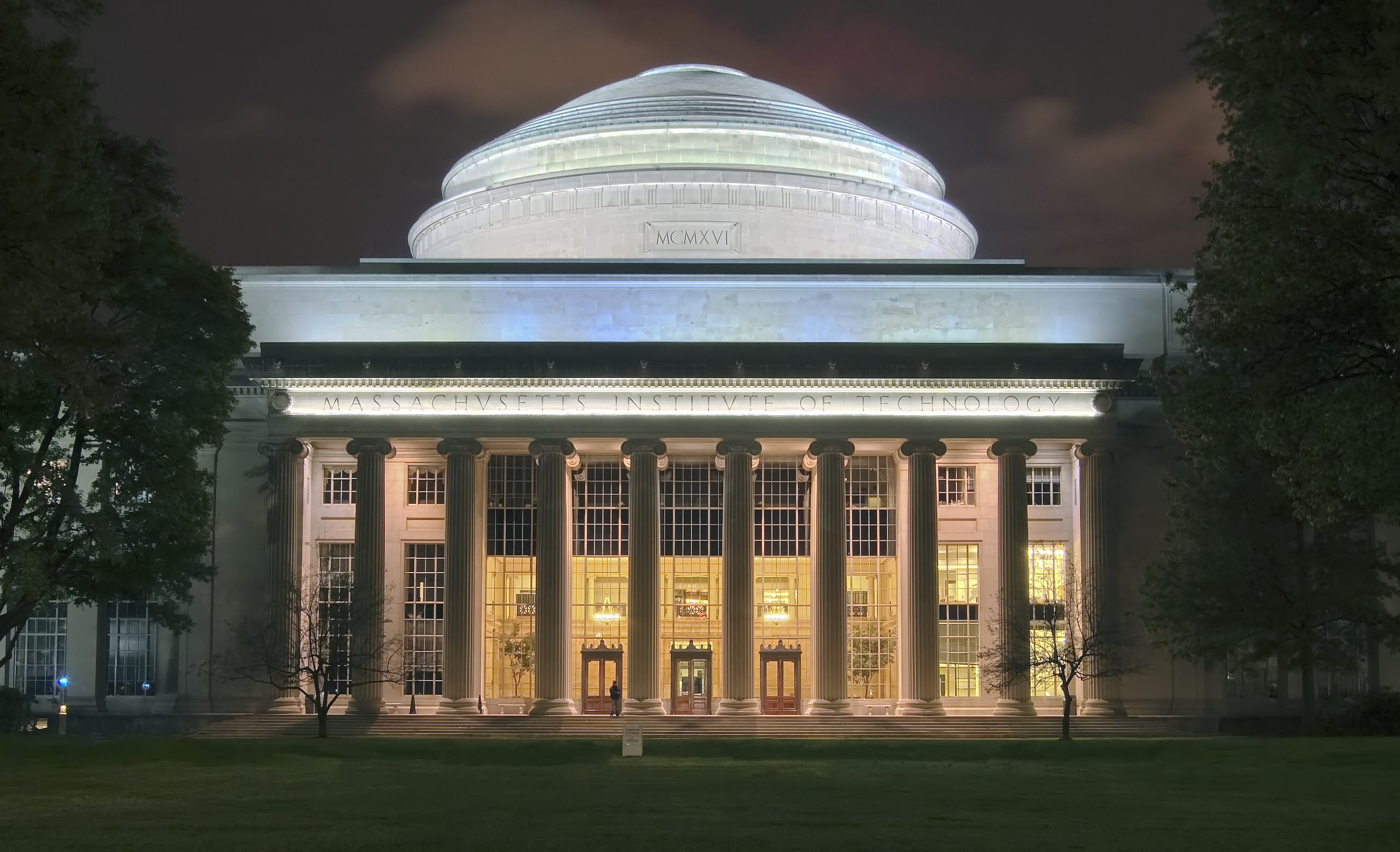
Harvard University (Widener Library at top) and MIT (MIT Building 10 at bottom) are regarded in the world's top few universities for academic research in various disciplines.

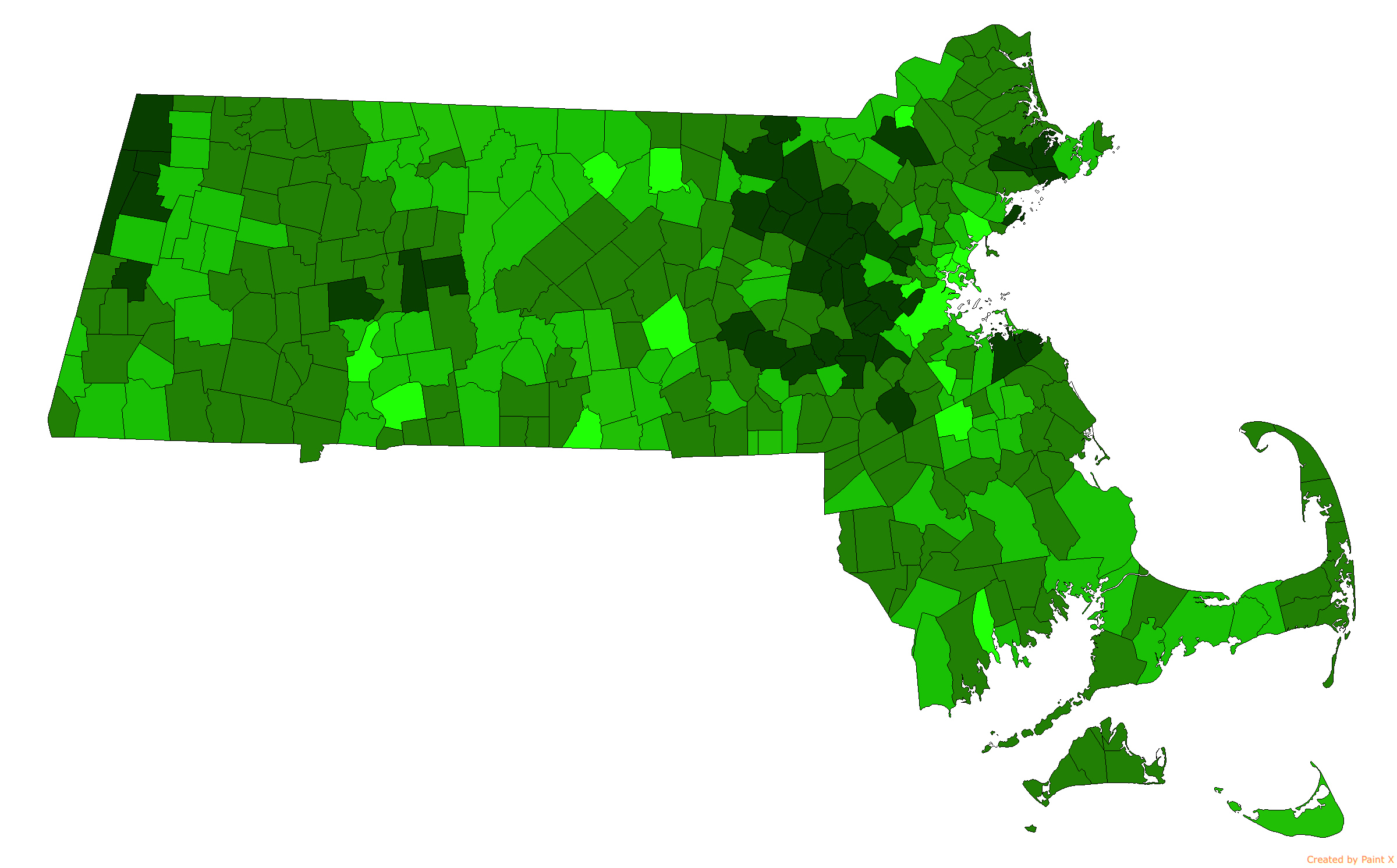
Towns in Massachusetts by combined mean SAT of their public high school district for the 2015–2016 academic year

In 2018, Massachusetts's overall educational system was ranked the top among all fifty U.S. states by U.S. News & World Report. Massachusetts was the first state in North America to require municipalities to appoint a teacher or establish a grammar school with the passage of the Massachusetts Education Law of 1647, and 19th century reforms pushed by Horace Mann laid much of the groundwork for contemporary universal public education which was established in 1852. Massachusetts is home to the oldest school in continuous existence in North America (The Roxbury Latin School, founded in 1645), as well as the country's oldest public elementary school (The Mather School, founded in 1639), its oldest high school (Boston Latin School, founded in 1635), its oldest continuously operating boarding school (The Governor's Academy, founded in 1763), its oldest college (Harvard University, founded in 1636), and its oldest women's college (Mount Holyoke College, founded in 1837). Massachusetts is also home to the highest ranked private high school in the United States, Phillips Academy in Andover, Massachusetts, which was founded in 1778.

Massachusetts's per-student public expenditure for elementary and secondary schools was eighth in the nation in 2012, at $14,844. In 2013, Massachusetts scored highest of all the states in math and third-highest in reading on the National Assessment of Educational Progress. The state's public school students are in the top tier of global academic performance. In 2022, Massachusetts was first or second in the reading and mathematics average scores and proficiency percentages of the evaluated 4th and 8th graders.

Massachusetts hosts 121 institutions of higher education. Harvard University and the Massachusetts Institute of Technology, both located in Cambridge, consistently rank among the world's best private universities and universities in general. In addition to Harvard and MIT, several other Massachusetts universities rank in the top 50 at the undergraduate level nationally in the widely cited rankings of U.S. News & World Report: Tufts University (#27), Boston College (#32), Brandeis University (#34), Boston University (#37) and Northeastern University (#40). Massachusetts is also home to three of the top five U.S. News & World Report's best Liberal Arts Colleges: Williams College (#1), Amherst College (#2), and Wellesley College (#4). It is also home to the oldest Catholic liberal arts college, College of the Holy Cross (#33). Boston Architectural College is New England's largest private college of spatial design. The public University of Massachusetts (nicknamed UMass) features five campuses in the state, with its flagship campus in Amherst, which enrolls more than 25,000.

As of 2021, Massachusetts has the highest percentage of adults over the age of 25 with a bachelor's degree (46.62%) and a graduate degree (21.27%) of any state in the country.

== Economy ==
According to the United States Bureau of Economic Analysis, Massachusetts's gross state product was $820.104 billion and its per capita personal income was $97,456 in 2025. As of January 2023, Massachusetts state general minimum wage is $15.00 per hour while the minimum wage for tipped workers is $6.75 an hour, with a guarantee that employers will pay the difference should a tipped employee's hourly wage not meet or exceed the general minimum wage. These minimum wage levels came about in January 2023, as part of a series of minimum wage amendments passed in 2018 that saw the minimum wage increase slowly every January up to 2023. In 2025, 99.5% of businesses in the state were small businesses and employed 1.5 million people, or 44.7% of the state's work force.

In 2015, twelve Fortune 500 companies were located in Massachusetts: Liberty Mutual, Massachusetts Mutual Life Insurance Company, TJX Companies, General Electric, Raytheon, American Tower, Global Partners, Thermo Fisher Scientific, State Street Corporation, Biogen, Eversource Energy, and Boston Scientific. CNBC's list of "Top States for Business for 2023" has recognized Massachusetts as the 15th-best state in the nation for business, and for the second year in a row in 2016 the state was ranked by Bloomberg as the most innovative state in America. According to a 2013 study by Phoenix Marketing International, Massachusetts had the sixth-largest number of millionaires per capita in the United States, with a ratio of 6.73 percent. Billionaires living in the state include past and present leaders (and related family) of local companies such as Fidelity Investments, New Balance, Kraft Group, Boston Scientific, and the former Continental Cablevision.

Massachusetts has three foreign-trade zones, the Massachusetts Port Authority of Boston, the Port of New Bedford, and the City of Holyoke. Boston-Logan International Airport is the busiest airport in New England, serving 33.4 million total passengers in 2015, and witnessing rapid growth in international air traffic since 2010.

Sectors vital to the Massachusetts economy include higher education, biotechnology, information technology, finance, health care, tourism, manufacturing, and defense. The Route 128 corridor and Greater Boston continue to be a major center for venture capital investment, and high technology remains an important sector. In recent years tourism has played an ever-important role in the state's economy, with Boston and Cape Cod being the leading destinations. Other popular tourist destinations include Salem, Plymouth, and the Berkshires. Massachusetts is the sixth-most popular tourist destination for foreign travelers. In 2010, the Great Places in Massachusetts Commission published '1,000 Great Places in Massachusetts' that identified 1,000 sites across the commonwealth to highlight the diverse historic, cultural, and natural attractions.

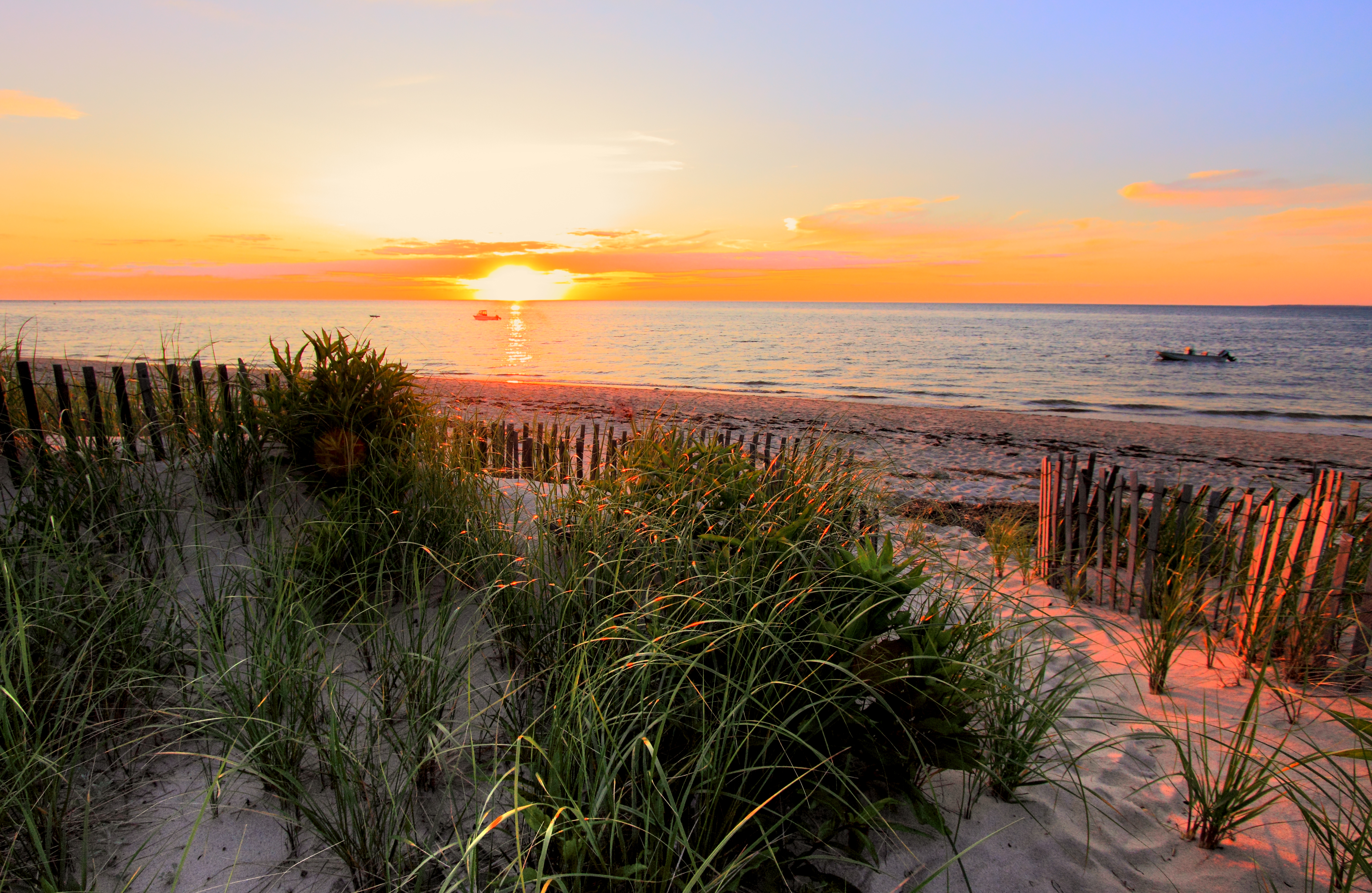
Sunset at Brewster, on Cape Cod Bay.

While manufacturing comprised less than 10% of Massachusetts's gross state product in 2016, the Commonwealth ranked 16th in the nation in total manufacturing output in the United States. This includes a diverse array of manufactured goods such as medical devices, paper goods, specialty chemicals and plastics, telecommunications and electronics equipment, and machined components.

The more than 33,000 nonprofits in Massachusetts employ one-sixth of the state's workforce. In 2007, Governor Deval Patrick signed into law a state holiday, Nonprofit Awareness Day.

In February 2017, U.S. News & World Report ranked Massachusetts the best state in the United States based upon 60 metrics including healthcare, education, crime, infrastructure, opportunity, economy, and government. Massachusetts ranked number one in education, number two in healthcare, and number five in the handling of the economy.

Massachusetts has faced increasing affordability issues in the 2020s, with the state ranking highly in income inequality and cost of living compared to other states. Housing in Massachusetts is among the most expensive in the country. These affordability pressures have helped drive one of the highest rates of domestic out-migration in the country, as residents increasingly leave Massachusetts for less expensive places to live.

As of May 2025, the unemployment rate in the state was 4.8%

=== Taxation ===
Depending on how it is calculated, state and local tax burden in Massachusetts has been estimated among U.S. states and Washington D.C. as 21st-highest (11.44% or $6,163 per year for a household with nationwide median income) or 25th-highest overall with below-average corporate taxes (39th-highest), above-average personal income taxes, (13th-highest), above-average sales tax (18th-highest), and below-average property taxes (46th-highest). In the 1970s, the Commonwealth ranked as a relatively high-tax state, gaining the pejorative nickname "Taxachusetts". This was followed by a round of tax limitations during the 1980s—a conservative period in American politics—including Proposition 2½.

As of January 1, 2020, Massachusetts has a flat-rate personal income tax of 5.00%, after a 2002 voter referendum to eventually lower the rate to 5.0% as amended by the legislature. There is a tax exemption for income below a threshold that varies from year to year. The corporate income tax rate is 8.8%, and the short-term capital gains tax rate is 12%. An unusual provision allows filers to voluntarily pay at the pre-referendum 5.85% income tax rate, which is done by between one and two thousand taxpayers per year.

The state imposes a 6.25% sales tax on retail sales of tangible personal property—except for groceries, clothing (up to $175.00), and periodicals. The sales tax is charged on clothing that costs more than $175.00, for the amount exceeding $175.00. Massachusetts also charges a use tax when goods are bought from other states and the vendor does not remit Massachusetts sales tax; taxpayers report and pay this on their income tax forms or dedicated forms, though there are "safe harbor" amounts that can be paid without tallying up actual purchases (except for purchases over $1,000). There is no inheritance tax and limited Massachusetts estate tax related to federal estate tax collection.

=== Energy ===
Massachusetts's electricity generation market was made competitive in 1998, enabling retail customers to change suppliers without changing utility companies. In 2018, Massachusetts consumed 1,459 trillion BTU, making it the seventh-lowest state in terms of consumption of energy per capita, and 31 percent of that energy came from natural gas. In 2014 and 2015, Massachusetts was ranked as the most energy efficient state the United States while Boston is the most efficient city, but it had the fourth-highest average residential retail electricity prices of any state. In 2018, renewable energy was about 7.2 percent of total energy consumed in the state, ranking 34th.

=== Power initiatives ===
The State of Massachusetts has developed a plethora of incentives to encourage the implementation of renewable energy and efficient appliances and home facilities. The Mass Save program, formed in conjunction with the State by several companies that provide power and gas in Massachusetts, provides homeowners and renters with monetary incentives to retrofit their homes with efficient HVAC equipment and other household appliances. Appliances such as water heaters, air conditioners, washers and driers, and heat pumps are eligible for rebates in order to incentivize change.

The concept of MassSave was created in 2008 by the passing of the Green Communities Act of 2008, during Deval Patrick's tenure as governor. The main goal of the Green Communities Act was to reduce the consumption of fossil fuels in the State and to encourage new, more efficient technologies. Among others, one result of this act was a requirement for Program Administrators of utilities to invest in saving energy, as opposed to purchasing and generating additional energy where economically feasible. In Massachusetts, eleven Program Administrators, including Eversource, National Grid, Western Massachusetts Electric, Cape Light Compact, Until, and Berkshire Gas, jointly own the rights to this program, in conjunction with the Department of Energy Resources (DOER) and the Energy Efficiency Advisory Council (EEAC).

The State Revenue Service provides incentives for the installation of solar panels. In addition to the Federal Residential Renewable energy credit, Massachusetts residents may be eligible for a tax credit of up to 15 percent of the project. Once installed, arrays are eligible for net metering. Certain municipalities will offer up to $1.20 per watt, up to 50 percent of the system's cost on PV arrays 25 kW or less. The Massachusetts Department of Energy Resources also offered low-interest, fixed-rate financing with loan support for low-income residents until December 31, 2020.

As a part of the Massachusetts Department of Energy Resources' effort to incentivize the usage of renewable energy, the Massachusetts Offers Rebates for Electric Vehicles (MOR-EV) initiative was created. With this incentive, residents may qualify for a state-provided incentive of up to $2,500 for the purchase or lease of an electric vehicle, or $1,500 for the purchase or lease of a plug-in hybrid vehicle. This rebate is available in addition to the tax credits offered by the United States Department of Energy for the purchase of electric and plug-in hybrid vehicles.

For income-eligible residents, Mass Save has partnered with Massachusetts Community Action Program Agencies and Low-Income Energy Affordability Network (LEAN) to offer residents assistance with upgrades to their homes that will result in more efficient energy usage. Residents may qualify for a replacement of their heating system, insulation installation, appliances, and thermostats if they meet the income qualifications provided on Mass Save's website. For residents of 5+ family residential buildings, there are additional income-restricted benefits available through LEAN. If at least 50 percent of the residents of the building qualify as low income, energy efficiency improvements like those available through Mass Save are available. Residential structures operated by non-profit organizations, for profit operations, or housing authorities may take advantage of these programs.

In late 2020, the administration of Massachusetts governor Charlie Baker released a decarbonization roadmap to aim for net-zero greenhouse gas emissions by 2050. The plan calls for major investments in offshore wind and solar energy. It would also require all new cars sold in the state to be zero-emissions (electric or hydrogen powered) by 2035.

=== Agriculture ===
As of 2022, there were 7,083 farms in Massachusetts whose products sold had a market value of around $607 million. The farms encompassed a total of 464,451 acres (1,880 km^{2}), averaging 66 acres (27 hectares) apiece. Greenhouse, floriculture, and sod products—including the ornamental market—make up more than one third of the state's agricultural output. Massachusetts is also the second highest domestic producer of cranberries. Sweet corn and apples are also produced in large quantities. Fruit cultivation is an important part of the state's agricultural revenues, and Massachusetts is the second-largest cranberry-producing state after Wisconsin.

== Transportation ==
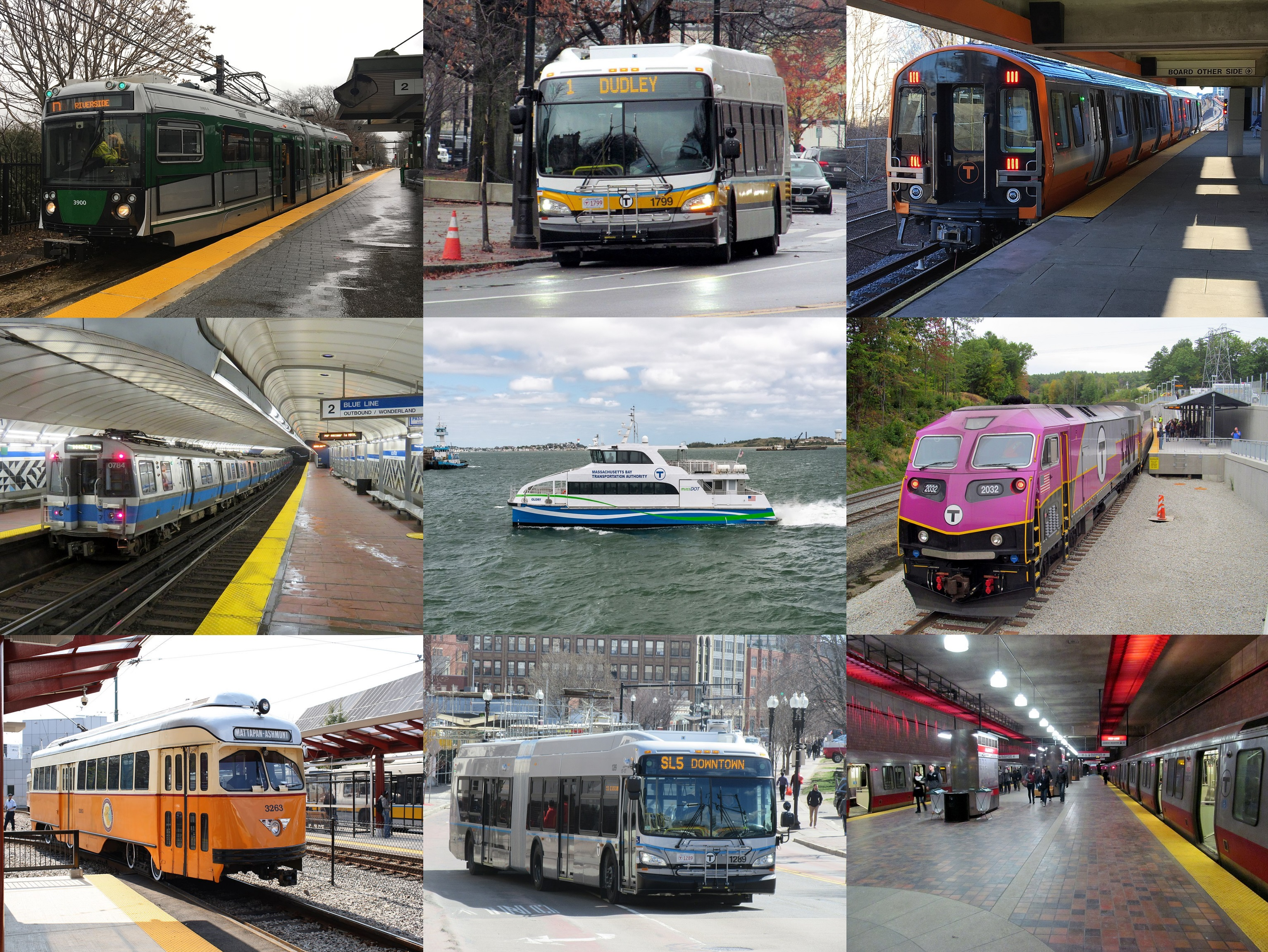
The Massachusetts Bay Transportation Authority serves Greater Boston.

For federal funding purposes, Massachusetts has 10 regional metropolitan planning organizations and three non-metropolitan planning organizations covering the remainder of the state; statewide planning is handled by the Massachusetts Department of Transportation. Transportation is the single largest source of greenhouse gas emissions by economic sector in Massachusetts.

=== Regional public transportation ===
The Massachusetts Bay Transportation Authority (MBTA), also known as "The T", operates public transportation in the form of subway, bus, and ferry systems in the Metro Boston area.

Fifteen other regional transit authorities provide public transportation in the form of bus services in the rest of the state. Four heritage railways are also in operation:

- The Cape Cod Central Railroad, operating from Hyannis to Buzzards Bay
- The Berkshire Scenic Railway, operating from Lee to Great Barrington
- Edaville Railroad in Carver
- The Lowell National Historical Park Trolley Line in Lowell

=== Long-distance rail and bus ===
Amtrak operates several inter-city rail lines in Massachusetts. Boston's South Station serves as the terminus for three lines, namely the high-speed Acela Express, which links to cities such as Providence, New Haven, New York City, and eventually Washington DC; the Northeast Regional, which follows the same route but includes many more stops, and also continues further south to Newport News in Virginia; and the Lake Shore Limited, which runs westward to Worcester, Springfield, and eventually Chicago. Boston's other major station, North Station, serves as the southern terminus for Amtrak's Downeaster, which connects to Portland and Brunswick in Maine.

Outside of Boston, Amtrak connects several cities across Massachusetts, along the aforementioned Acela, Northeast Regional, Lake Shore Limited, and Downeaster lines, as well as other routes in central and western Massachusetts. The Amtrak Hartford Line connects Springfield to New Haven, operated in conjunction with the Connecticut Department of Transportation, and the Valley Flyer runs a similar route but continues further north to Greenfield. Several stations in western Massachusetts are also served by the Vermonter, which connects St. Albans, Vermont to Washington DC.

Amtrak carries more passengers between Boston and New York than all airlines combined (about 54% of market share in 2012), but service between other cities is less frequent. There, more frequent intercity service is provided by private bus carriers, with the largest being Peter Pan Bus Lines, Greyhound Lines, and FlixBus. Various Chinatown bus lines depart for New York from South Station in Boston.

MBTA Commuter Rail services run throughout the larger Greater Boston area, including service to Worcester, Fitchburg, Haverhill, Newburyport, Lowell, and Kingston. This overlaps with the service areas of neighboring regional transportation authorities. As of the summer of 2013 the Cape Cod Regional Transit Authority in collaboration with the MBTA and the Massachusetts Department of Transportation (MassDOT) is operating the CapeFLYER providing passenger rail service between Boston and Cape Cod.

=== Ferry ===
Most ports north of Cape Cod are served by Boston Harbor Cruises, which operates ferry services in and around Greater Boston under contract with the Massachusetts Bay Transportation Authority. Several routes connect the downtown area with Hingham, Hull, Winthrop, Salem, Logan Airport, Charlestown, and some of the islands located within the harbor. The same company also operates seasonal service between Boston and Provincetown.

On the southern shore of the state, several different passenger ferry lines connect Martha's Vineyard to ports along the mainland, including Woods Hole, Hyannis, New Bedford, and Falmouth, all in Massachusetts, as well as North Kingstown in Rhode Island, Highlands in New Jersey, and New York City in New York. Similarly, several different lines connect Nantucket to ports including Hyannis, New Bedford, Harwich, and New York City. Service between the two islands is also offered. The dominant companies serving these routes include The Steamship Authority, Hy-Line Cruises, and Seastreak, the former of which regulates all passenger services in the region and is also the only company permitted to offer freight ferry services to the islands.

Other ferry connections in the state include a water taxi connecting various points in Fall River, seasonal ferry service connecting Plymouth to Provincetown, and a service between New Bedford and Cuttyhunk.

=== Rail freight ===
As of 2018, a number of freight railroads were operating in Massachusetts, with Class I railroad CSX being the largest carrier, and another Class 1, Norfolk Southern serving the state via its Pan Am Southern joint partnership. Several regional and short line railroads also provide service and connect with other railroads. Massachusetts has a total of 1,110 miles (1,790 km) of freight trackage in operation.

=== Air service ===
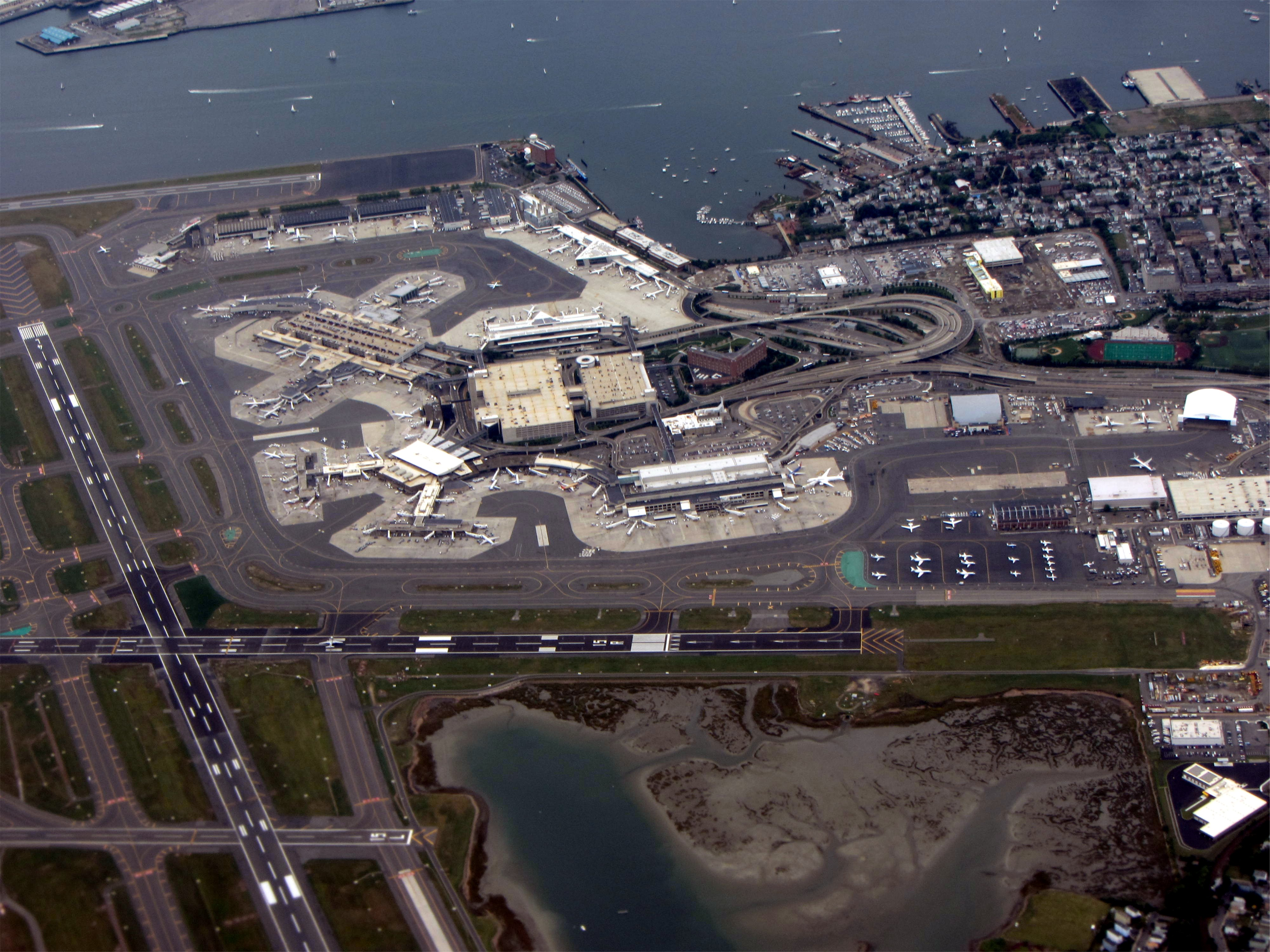
Logan International Airport in Boston is the largest passenger volume airport in New England.

Boston Logan International Airport served 33.5 million passengers in 2015 (up from 31.6 million in 2014) through 103 gates. Logan, Hanscom Field in Bedford, and Worcester Regional Airport are operated by Massport, an independent state transportation agency. Massachusetts has 39 public-use airfields and more than 200 private landing spots. Some airports receive funding from the Aeronautics Division of the Massachusetts Department of Transportation and the Federal Aviation Administration; the FAA is also the primary regulator of Massachusetts air travel.

=== Roads ===
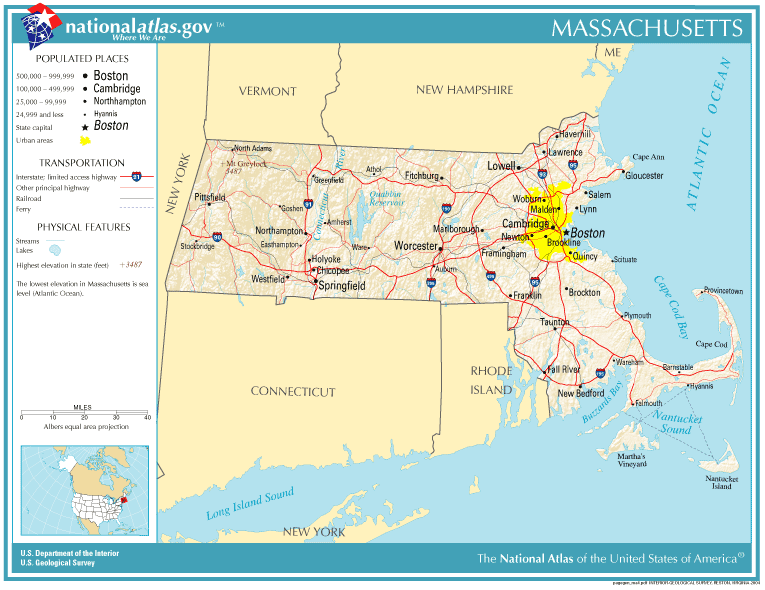
Prominent roads and cities in Massachusetts

There are a total of 36,800 miles (59,200 km) of interstates and other highways in Massachusetts. Interstate 90 (I-90, also known as the Massachusetts Turnpike), is the longest interstate in Massachusetts. The route travels 136 mi (219 km) generally west to east, entering Massachusetts at the New York state line in the town of West Stockbridge, and passes just north of Springfield, just south of Worcester and through Framingham before terminating near Logan International Airport in Boston.

Other major interstates include I-91, which travels generally north and south along the Connecticut River; I-93, which travels north and south through central Boston, then passes through Methuen before entering New Hampshire; and I-95, which connects Providence, Rhode Island with Greater Boston, forming a partial loop concurrent with Route 128 around the more urbanized areas before continuing north along the coast into New Hampshire.

I-495 forms a wide loop around the outer edge of Greater Boston. Other major interstates in Massachusetts include I-291, I-391, I-84, I-195, I-395, I-290, and I-190. Major non-interstate highways in Massachusetts include U.S. Routes 1, 3, 5, 6, 7, 20, and 44, and state routes 2, 2A, 3, 9, 24, and 128. A great majority of interstates in Massachusetts were constructed during the mid-20th century, and at times were controversial, particularly the intent to route I-95 northeastwards from Providence, Rhode Island, directly through central Boston, first proposed in 1948. Opposition to continued construction grew, and in 1970 Governor Francis W. Sargent issued a general prohibition on most further freeway construction within the I-95/Route 128 loop in the Boston area. A massive undertaking to bring I-93 underground in downtown Boston, called the Big Dig, brought the city's highway system under public scrutiny for its high cost and construction quality.

== Government and politics ==
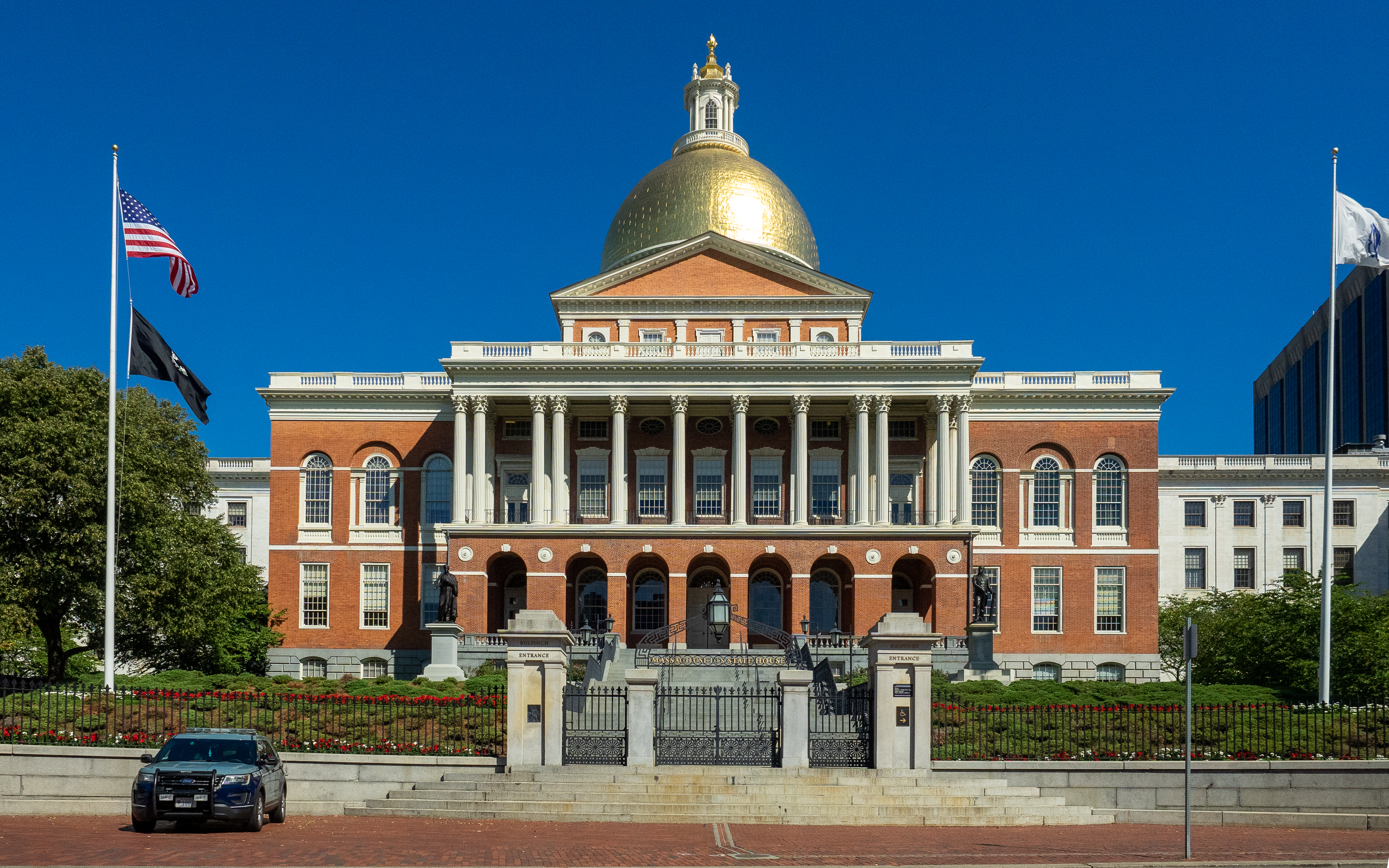
The Massachusetts State House is topped with a golden dome, and faces Boston Common on Beacon Hill.

Massachusetts has a long political history; earlier political structures included the Mayflower Compact of 1620, the separate Massachusetts Bay and Plymouth colonies, and the combined colonial Province of Massachusetts. The Massachusetts Constitution was ratified in 1780 while the Revolutionary War was in progress, four years after the Articles of Confederation was drafted, and eight years before the present United States Constitution was ratified on June 21, 1788. Drafted by John Adams, the Massachusetts Constitution is the oldest functioning written constitution in continuous effect in the world. It has been amended 121 times, most recently in 2022.

Massachusetts politics since the second half of the 20th century have generally been dominated by the Democratic Party, and the state has a reputation for being the most liberal state in the country. In 1974, Elaine Noble became the first openly lesbian or gay candidate elected to a state legislature in US history. The state's 12th congressional district elected the first openly gay member of the United States House of Representatives, Gerry Studds, in 1972 and in 2004, Massachusetts became the first state to allow same-sex marriage.

In 2006, Massachusetts became the first state to approve a law that provided for nearly universal healthcare. Massachusetts has a pro-sanctuary city law. As of 2024, Massachusetts has a Democratic Governor, two Democratic Senators, and all nine Congressional Representatives are Democrats. Massachusetts is a blue state; Ronald Reagan was the last Republican to win the state in 1984.

In a 2020 study, Massachusetts was ranked as the 11th easiest state for citizens to vote in.

=== Government ===
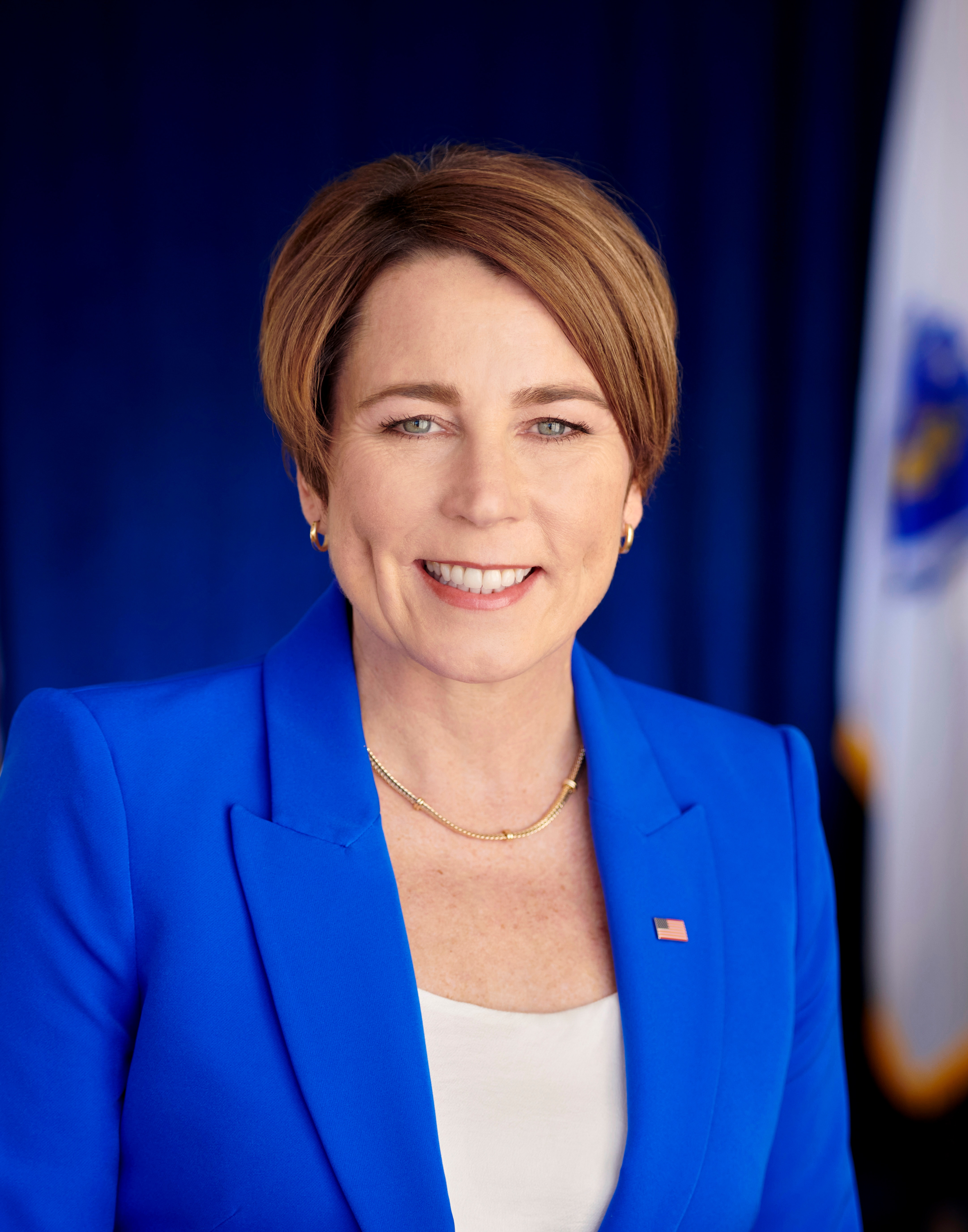
Maura Healey (D) is the 73rd Governor of Massachusetts.

The Government of Massachusetts is divided into three branches: executive, legislative, and judicial. The governor of Massachusetts heads the executive branch. Legislative authority vests in a separate but coequal legislature. Judicial power is constitutionally guaranteed to the independent judicial branch.

==== Executive branch ====
As chief executive, the governor is responsible for signing or vetoing legislation, filling judicial and agency appointments, granting pardons, preparing an annual budget, and commanding the Massachusetts National Guard. Massachusetts governors, unlike those of most other states, are addressed as His/Her Excellency. The governor is Maura Healey and the incumbent lieutenant governor is Kim Driscoll. The governor conducts the affairs of state alongside a separate Governor's Council made up of the lieutenant governor and eight separately elected councilors. The council is charged by the state constitution with reviewing and confirming gubernatorial appointments and pardons, approving disbursements out of the state treasury, and certifying elections, among other duties.

The executive branch includes four independently elected constitutional officers: a secretary of the commonwealth, an attorney general, a state treasurer, and a state auditor. The commonwealth's incumbent constitutional officers are respectively William F. Galvin, Andrea Campbell, Deb Goldberg and Diana DiZoglio, all Democrats. In accordance with state statute, the secretary of the commonwealth administers elections, regulates lobbyists and the securities industry, registers corporations, serves as register of deeds for the entire state, and preserves public records as keeper of the state seal.

The attorney general provides legal services to state agencies, combats fraud and corruption, investigates and prosecutes crimes, and enforces consumer protection, environment, labor, and civil rights laws as Massachusetts chief lawyer and law enforcement officer. The state treasurer manages the state's cash flow, debt, and investments as chief financial officer. The state auditor conducts audits, investigations, and studies as chief audit executive in order to promote government accountability and transparency and improve state agency financial management, legal compliance, and performance.

==== Legislative branch ====
The Massachusetts House of Representatives and Massachusetts Senate comprise the legislature of Massachusetts, known as the Massachusetts General Court. The House consists of 160 members while the Senate has 40 members. Leaders of the House and Senate are chosen by the members of those bodies; the leader of the House is known as the Speaker while the leader of the Senate is known as the President. Each branch consists of several committees. Members of both bodies are elected to two-year terms.

==== Judicial branch ====
The Massachusetts Supreme Judicial Court (a chief justice and six associates) are appointed by the governor and confirmed by the Governor's Council, as are all other judges in the state.

Federal court cases are heard in the United States District Court for the District of Massachusetts, and appeals are heard by the United States Court of Appeals for the First Circuit.

==== Federal representation ====
The congressional delegation from Massachusetts is entirely Democratic. The senators are Elizabeth Warren and Ed Markey while the representatives are Richard Neal (1st), Jim McGovern (2nd), Lori Trahan (3rd), Jake Auchincloss (4th), Katherine Clark (5th), Seth Moulton (6th), Ayanna Pressley (7th), Stephen Lynch (8th), and Bill Keating (9th).

In U.S. presidential elections since 2012, Massachusetts has been allotted 11 votes in the electoral college, out of a total of 538. Like most states, Massachusetts's electoral votes are granted in a winner-take-all system.

=== Politics ===
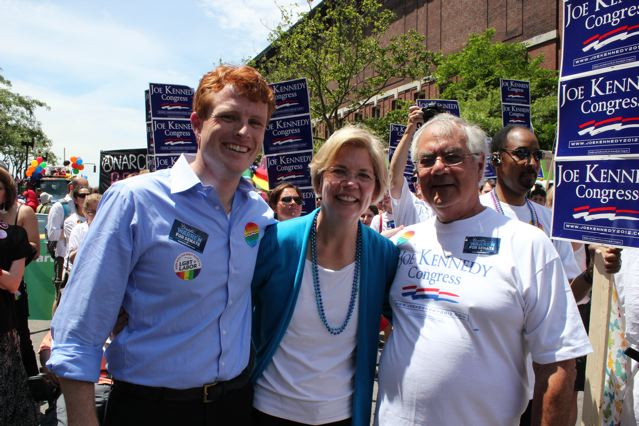
Representative Joe Kennedy III, Senator Elizabeth Warren, and former representative Barney Frank attended the Boston Pride Parade in 2012.

Once a Republican-leaning state, for more than 70 years Massachusetts has been largely dominated by Democrats; the 1952 victory of John F. Kennedy over incumbent Senator Henry Cabot Lodge Jr. is seen as a watershed moment in this transformation. His younger brother Edward M. Kennedy held that seat until his death from a brain tumor in 2009. Since the 1950s, Massachusetts has gained a reputation as being a politically liberal state and is often used as an archetype of modern liberalism, hence the phrase "Massachusetts liberal".

Massachusetts is one of the most Democratic states in the country. The Democratic Party predominates throughout, except for a handful of Republican-leaning towns in the central and southern parts of the state. Republicans once dominated in the northern and western suburbs of Boston; however, both areas heavily swung Democratic in the era of Donald Trump. The state as a whole has not given its Electoral College votes to a Republican in a presidential election since Ronald Reagan carried it in 1984, and not a single county has voted for a Republican presidential candidate since 1988. While supporting Reagan twice, Massachusetts provided his smallest margins of victory in both the 1980 and 1984 elections. Massachusetts had been the only state to vote for Democrat George McGovern in the 1972 presidential election. In 2020, Biden received 65.6% of the vote, the best performance in over 50 years for a Democrat.

Democrats have an absolute grip on the Massachusetts congressional delegation; there are no Republicans elected to serve at the federal level. Both Senators and all nine Representatives are Democrats; only one Republican (former Senator Scott Brown) has been elected to either house of Congress from Massachusetts since 1994. Massachusetts is the most populous state to be represented in the United States Congress entirely by a single party.

After the 2018 elections, the Democratic Party held a super-majority over the Republican Party in both chambers of the Massachusetts General Court (state legislature). Out of the state house's 160 seats, Democrats hold 127 seats (79%) compared to the Republican Party's 32 seats (20%), an independent sits in the remaining one, and 37 out of the 40 seats in the state senate (92.5%) belong to the Democratic Party compared to the Republican Party's three seats (7.5%). Both houses of the legislature have had Democratic majorities since the 1950s.

Party registration as of February 2025:
Party	Total voters	Percentage
Unenrolled	3,254,435	64.75%
Democratic	1,298,603	25.83%
Republican	423,387	8.42%
Other	49,401	0.98%
Total	5,025,826	100.00%

Despite the state's general Democratic lean, Massachusetts has frequently elected Republicans as Governor: only two Democrats (Deval Patrick and Maura Healey) have won the governorship since 1991, and among gubernatorial election results from 2002 to 2022, Republican nominees garnered 48.4% of the vote compared to 45.7% for Democratic nominees. These have been considered to be among the most moderate Republican leaders in the nation; they have received higher net favorability ratings from the state's Democrats than Republicans.

A number of contemporary national political issues have been influenced by events in Massachusetts, such as the decision in 2003 by the state Supreme Judicial Court allowing same-sex marriage and a 2006 bill which mandated health insurance for all Massachusetts residents. In 2008, Massachusetts voters passed an initiative decriminalizing possession of small amounts of marijuana. Voters in Massachusetts also approved a ballot measure in 2012 that legalized the medical use of marijuana. Following the approval of a ballot question endorsing legalization in 2016, Massachusetts began issuing licenses for the regulated sale of recreational marijuana in June 2018. The licensed sale of recreational marijuana became legal on July 1, 2018; however, the lack of state-approved testing facilities prevented the sale of any product for several weeks. However, in 2020, a ballot initiative to implement Ranked-Choice Voting failed, despite being championed by many progressives.

Massachusetts is one of the most pro-choice states in the Union. A 2014 Pew Research Center poll found that 74% of Massachusetts residents supported the right to an abortion in all/most cases, making Massachusetts the most pro-choice state in the United States.

In 2020, the state legislature overrode Governor Charlie Baker's veto of the ROE Act, a controversial law that codified existing abortion laws in case the Supreme Court overturned Roe v. Wade, dropped the age of parental consent for those seeking an abortion from 18 to 16, and legalized abortion after 24 weeks, if a fetus had fatal anomalies, or "to preserve the patient's physical or mental health."

The 2023 American Values Atlas by Public Religion Research Institute found that same-sex marriage is supported near-universally by Massachusettsans.

== Cities, towns, and counties ==
As of 2023, there are 292 towns and 59 cities in Massachusetts. Over time, many towns have voted to become cities; 14 municipalities still refer to themselves as "towns" even though they have a city form of government. (See Administrative divisions of Massachusetts § Form of government: city vs. town.) Massachusetts, along with the five other New England states, features the local governmental structure known as the New England town. In this structure, incorporated towns—as opposed to townships or counties—hold many of the responsibilities and powers of local government.

The fourteen counties of Massachusetts, moving roughly from west to east, are Berkshire, Franklin, Hampshire, Hampden, Worcester, Middlesex, Essex, Suffolk, Norfolk, Bristol, Plymouth, Barnstable, Dukes, and Nantucket. Most of the county governments were abolished by the State of Massachusetts beginning in 1997 including Middlesex County, the largest county in the state by population. The voters of these now-defunct counties elect only Sheriffs and Registers of Deeds, who are part of the state government. Other counties have been reorganized, and a few still retain county councils.

Boston is the state capital in Massachusetts. The population of the city proper is 692,600, and Greater Boston, with a population of 4,873,019, is the 11th largest metropolitan area in the nation. Other cities with a population over 100,000 include Worcester, Springfield, Lowell, Cambridge, Brockton, Quincy, New Bedford, and Lynn. Plymouth is the largest municipality in the state by land area, followed by Middleborough.

Largest cities or towns in Massachusetts 2020 United States census (April 1, 2020)
Rank	Name	County	Pop.	Rank	Name	County	Pop.
1	Boston	Suffolk	675,647	11	Lawrence	Essex	89,143
2	Worcester	Worcester	206,518	12	Newton	Middlesex	88,923
3	Springfield	Hampden	155,929	13	Somerville	Middlesex	81,045
4	Cambridge	Middlesex	118,403	14	Framingham	Middlesex	72,362
5	Lowell	Middlesex	115,554	15	Haverhill	Essex	67,787
6	Brockton	Plymouth	105,643	16	Malden	Middlesex	66,263
7	Quincy	Norfolk	101,636	17	Waltham	Middlesex	65,218
8	Lynn	Essex	101,253	18	Brookline	Norfolk	63,191
9	New Bedford	Bristol	101,079	19	Revere	Suffolk	62,186
10	Fall River	Bristol	94,000	20	Plymouth	Plymouth	61,217

== Culture ==
Massachusetts has contributed to American arts and culture. Drawing from its Native American and Yankee roots, along with later immigrant groups, Massachusetts has had several writers, artists, and musicians. It has major museums and important historical sites, and the state's history and heritage are celebrated by events and festivals.

Massachusetts became an early center of the Transcendentalist movement, which emphasized intuition, emotion, human individuality and a deeper connection with nature. Ralph Waldo Emerson, who was born in Boston but spent much of his later life in Concord, largely created the philosophy with his 1836 work Nature, and continued to be a key figure in the movement for the remainder of his life. Emerson's friend, Henry David Thoreau, who was also involved in Transcendentalism, recorded his year spent alone in a small cabin at nearby Walden Pond in the 1854 work Walden; or, Life in the Woods.

Other famous authors and poets born or strongly associated with Massachusetts include Anne Bradstreet, Nathaniel Hawthorne, Louisa May Alcott, Robert Frost, Emily Dickinson, Henry Wadsworth Longfellow, Edith Wharton, E.E. Cummings, Herman Melville, W.E.B. Du Bois, Sylvia Plath, Elizabeth Bishop, John Updike, Anne Sexton, H.P. Lovecraft, Edgar Allan Poe, Helen Hunt Jackson, Khalil Gibran, Mary Higgins Clark, Amelia Atwater-Rhodes, Jack Kerouac and Theodor Seuss Geisel, better known as "Dr. Seuss". Famous painters from Massachusetts include Winslow Homer and Norman Rockwell; many of the latter's works are on display at the Norman Rockwell Museum in Stockbridge.

Massachusetts is an important center for the performing arts. It has the Boston Symphony Orchestra, Boston Pops Orchestra the Cape Cod Symphony Orchestra in Barnstable, the New Bedford Symphony Orchestra, and the Springfield Symphony Orchestra. Tanglewood in western Massachusetts is a music venue that hosts the Tanglewood Music Festival and Tanglewood Jazz Festival, and is the annual host for the Boston Symphony Orchestra.

Other performing arts and theater organizations include the Boston Ballet, the Boston Lyric Opera, and the Lenox-based Shakespeare & Company. Massachusetts has produced musicians of many contemporary genres, such as the classic rock bands Aerosmith and Boston, the proto-punk band the Modern Lovers, the new wave band the Cars, and the alternative rock band Pixies. The state has also been the birthplace of the rock bands Staind, Godsmack, and Highly Suspect, since these bands all were formed in Massachusetts cities such Springfield, Lawrence, and Cape Cod respectively. Film events in the state include the Boston Film Festival, the Boston International Film Festival, and a number of smaller film festivals in various cities throughout Massachusetts.

Massachusetts has many museums and historical sites, including the Clark Art Institute, the Museum of Fine Arts, Boston, the Institute of Contemporary Art, Boston, and the DeCordova contemporary art and sculpture museum in Lincoln, and the Maria Mitchell Association in Nantucket includes several observatories, museums, and an aquarium. Historically themed museums and sites such as the Springfield Armory National Historic Site in Springfield, Boston's Freedom Trail, and nearby Minute Man National Historical Park, both of which preserve many sites important during the American Revolution, the Lowell National Historical Park, which focuses on some of the earliest mills and canals of the Industrial Revolution in the US, the Black Heritage Trail in Boston, which includes important African-American and abolitionist sites in Boston, and the New Bedford Whaling National Historical Park all showcase various periods of Massachusetts's history. Plymouth Rock, marks the disembarkation site of the Mayflower Pilgrims who founded Plymouth Colony in December 1620.

Plimoth Patuxet Museums and Old Sturbridge Village are two open-air or "living" museums in Massachusetts, recreating life as it was in the 17th and early 19th centuries, respectively.

Boston's annual St. Patrick's Day parade and "Harborfest", a week-long Fourth of July celebration featuring a fireworks display and concert by the Boston Pops as well as a turnaround cruise in Boston Harbor by the USS Constitution, are popular events. The New England Summer Nationals, an auto show in Worcester, draws tens of thousands of attendees every year. The Boston Marathon is also a popular event in the state drawing more than 30,000 runners and tens of thousands of spectators annually.

Long-distance hiking trails in Massachusetts include the Appalachian Trail, the New England National Scenic Trail, the Metacomet-Monadnock Trail, the Midstate Trail, and the Bay Circuit Trail. Other outdoor recreational activities in Massachusetts include sailing and yachting, freshwater and deep-sea fishing, whale watching, downhill and cross-country skiing, and hunting.

Massachusetts is one of the states with the largest percentage of Catholics. It has many sanctuaries such as the National Shrine of The Divine Mercy (Stockbridge, Massachusetts).

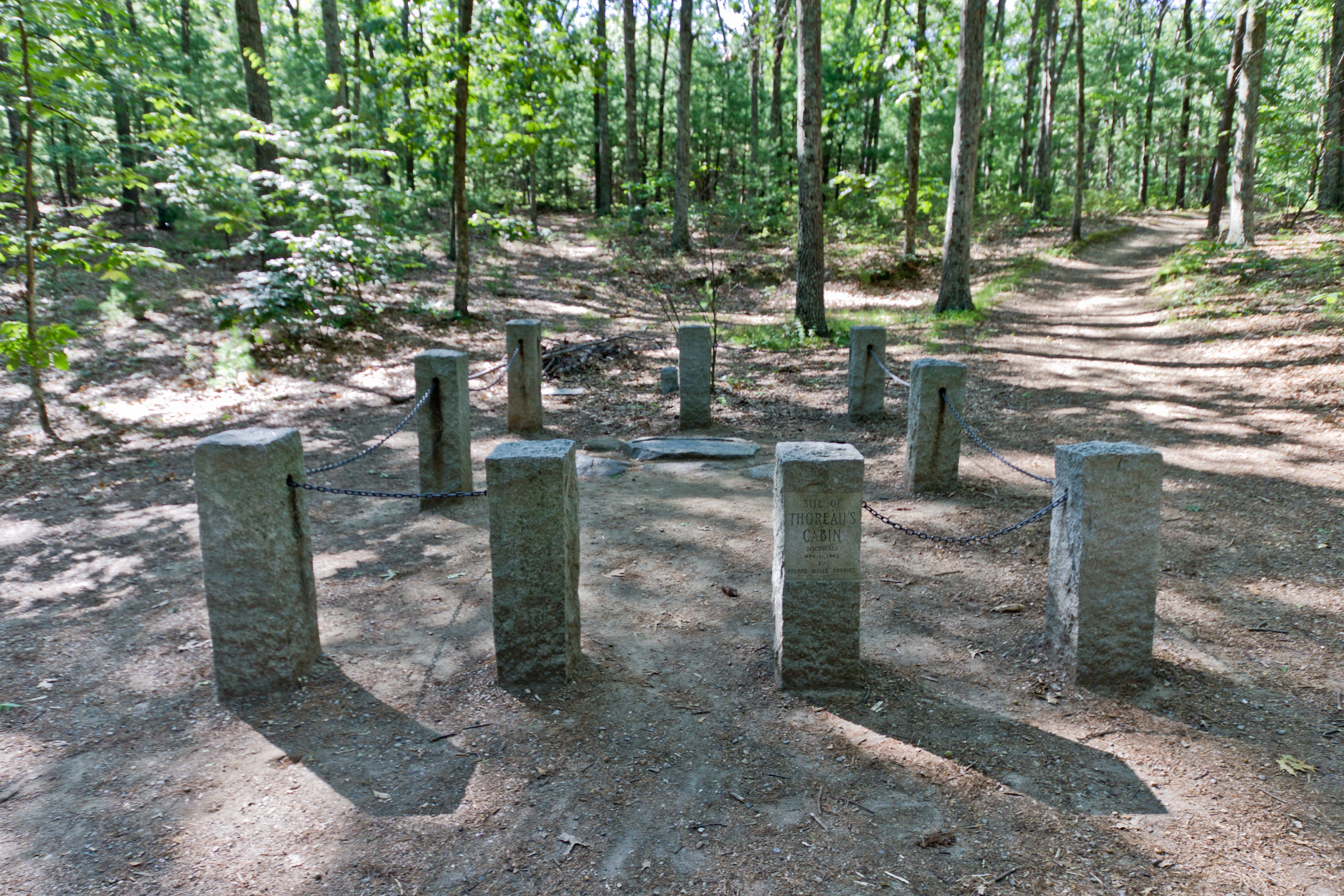
The site of Henry David Thoreau's cabin is at Walden Pond in Concord.

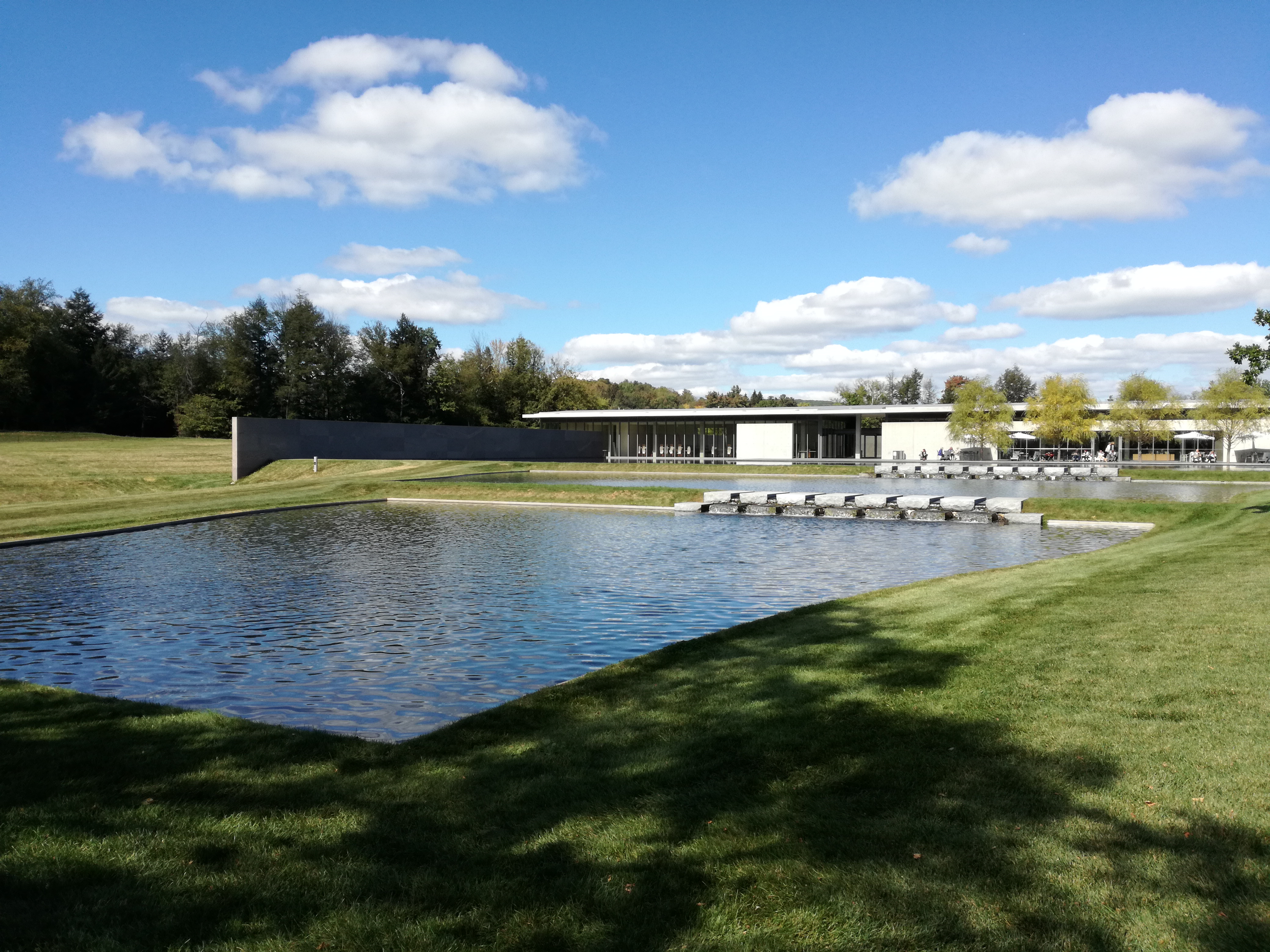
Massachusetts hosts many prestigious art museums, such as the Clark Art Institute.

An outdoor dance performance at Jacob's Pillow in Becket.

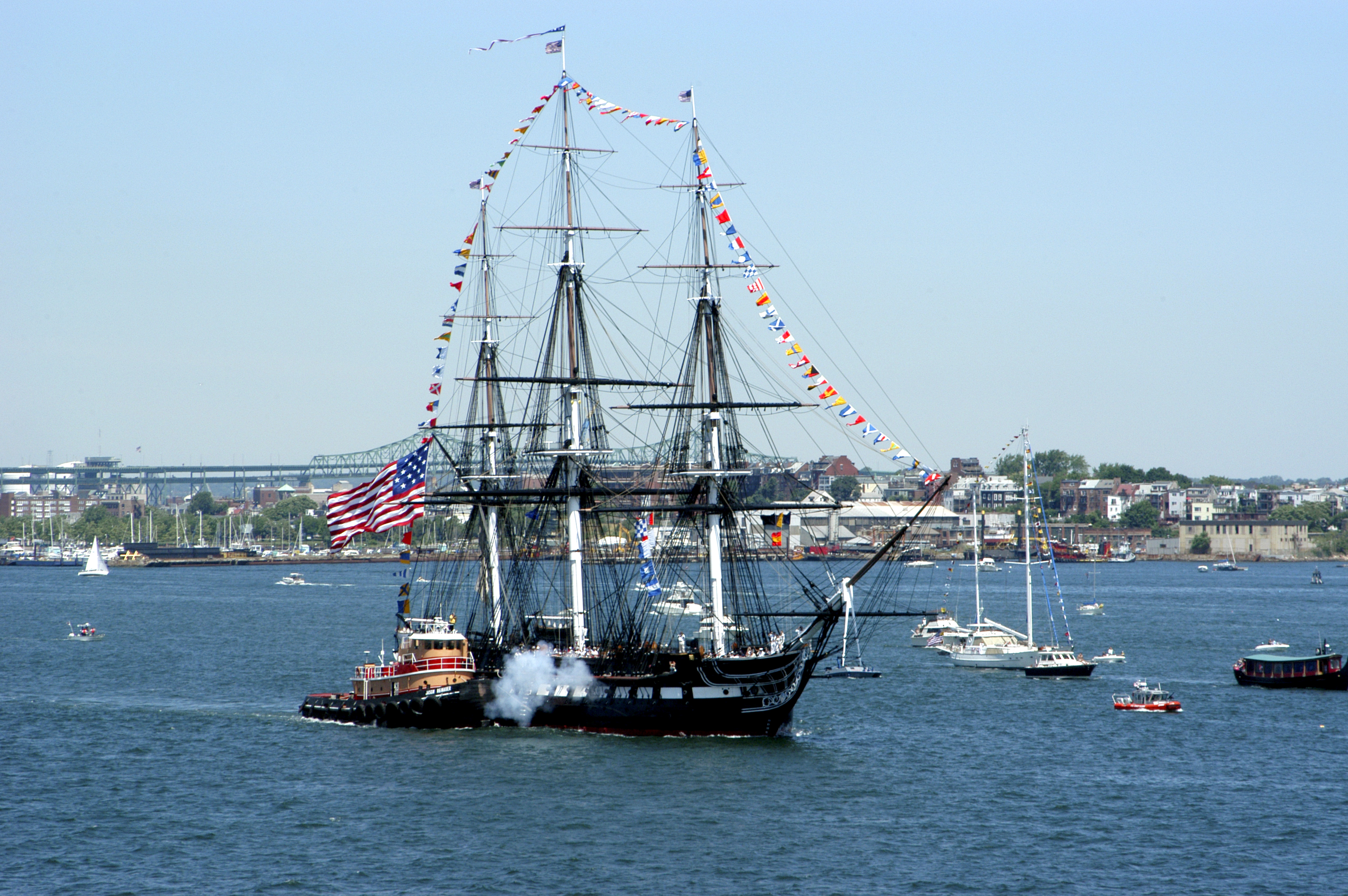
The USS Constitution fires a salute during its annual Fourth of July turnaround cruise.

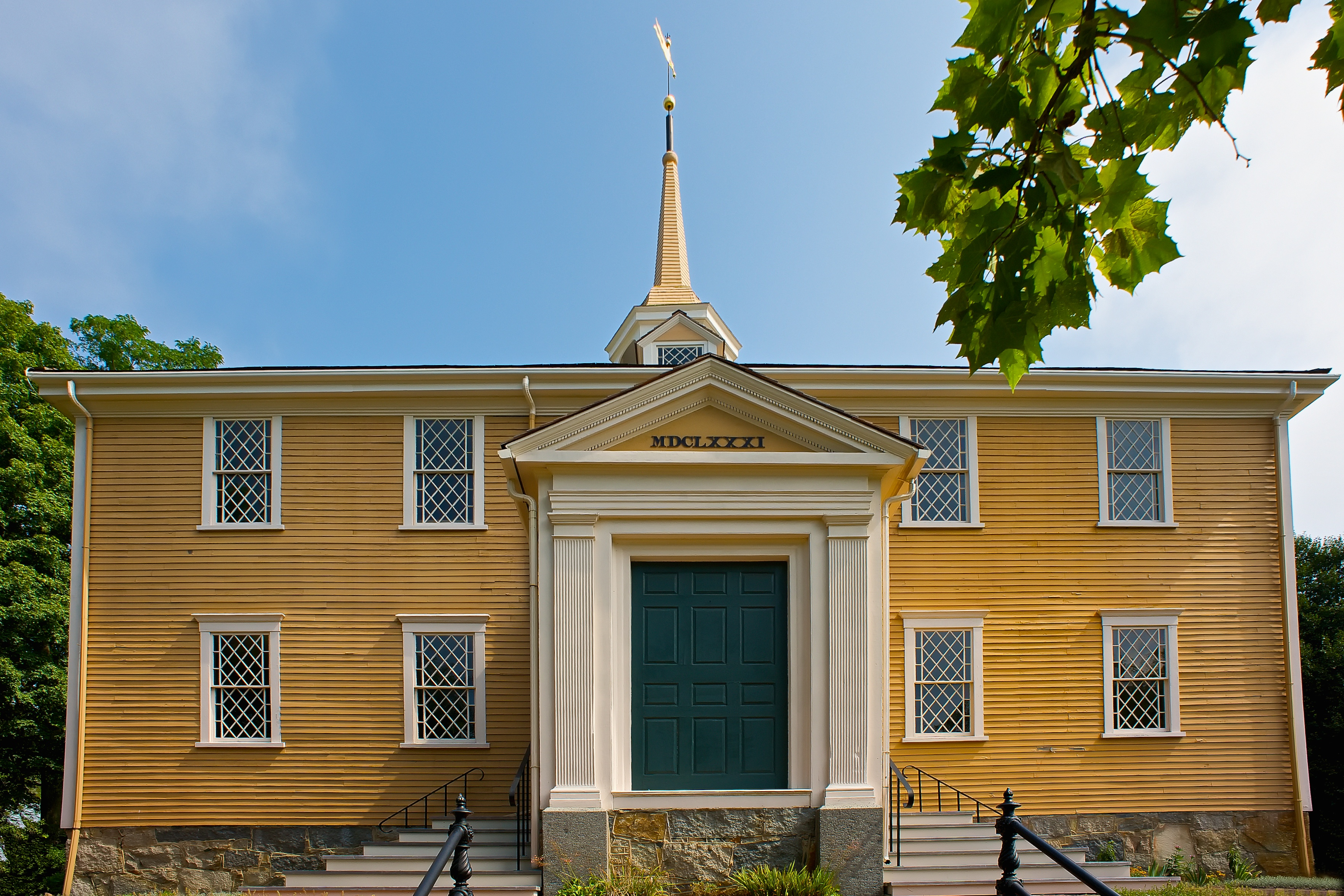
The Old Ship Church in Hingham was built in 1681, and is the oldest church in America in continuous ecclesiastical use. The Massachusetts population has since become one of the most irreligious of US states.

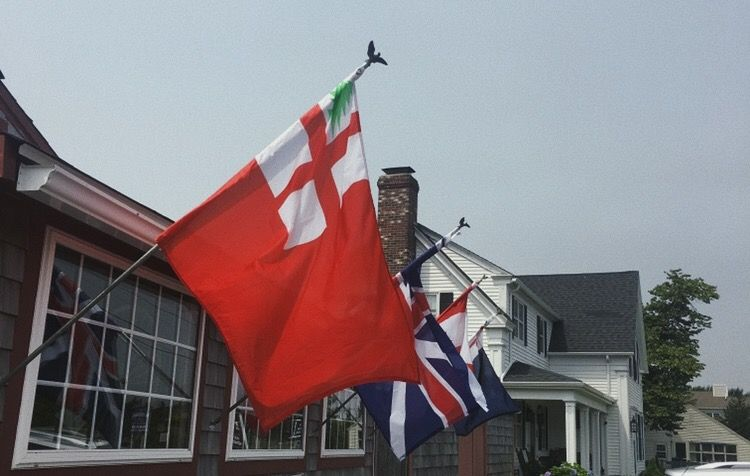
Massachusetts has the largest population of the New England states. New Englander culture and identity remains strong in Massachusetts (Flag of New England pictured above).

== Media ==
There are two major television media markets located in Massachusetts. The Boston/Manchester market is the fifth-largest in the United States. The other market surrounds the Springfield area. WGBH-TV in Boston is a major public television station and produces national programs such as Nova, Frontline, and American Experience.

The Boston Globe, Boston Herald, Springfield Republican, and the Worcester Telegram & Gazette are Massachusetts's largest daily newspapers. In addition, there are many community dailies and weeklies. The Associated Press maintains a bureau in Boston, and local news wire the State House News Service feeds coverage of state government to other Massachusetts media outlets. There are a number of major AM and FM stations which serve Massachusetts, along with many more regional and community-based stations. Some colleges and universities also operate campus television and radio stations, and print their own newspapers.

== Health ==
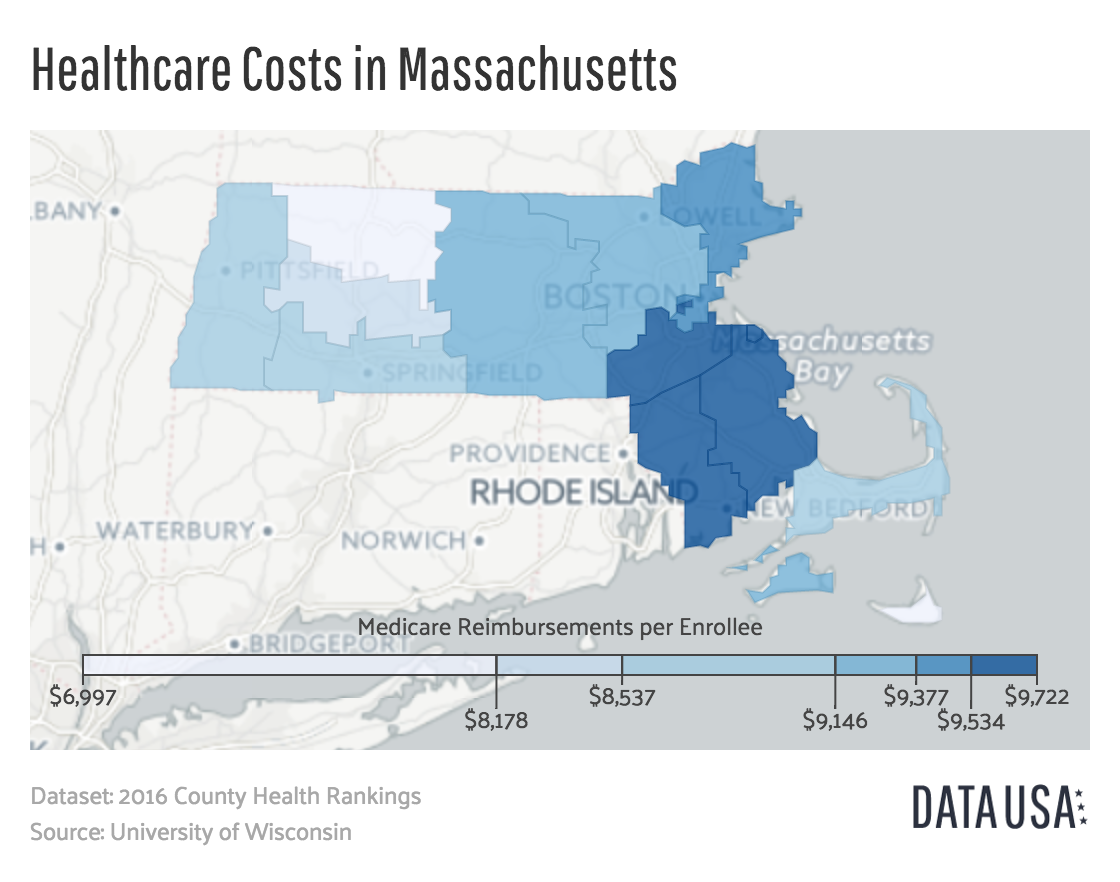
A map of the average Medicare reimbursement per enrollee by county, 2016.

Massachusetts generally ranks highly among states in most health and disease prevention categories. In 2015, the United Health Foundation ranked the state as third-healthiest overall. Massachusetts has the most doctors per 100,000 residents (435.38), the second-lowest infant mortality rate (3.8), and the lowest percentage of uninsured residents (children as well as the total population).

In 2018, commonwealth residents had an average life expectancy of 80.41 years, the fifth-longest in the country. In 2015, 36.1% of the population was overweight and 24.4% were obese. Massachusetts ranks sixth-highest in the percentage of residents who are considered neither obese nor overweight (39.5%). In 2018, Massachusetts ranked above average in the prevalence of binge drinking, which is the 20th-highest in the country.

The nation's first Marine Hospital was erected by federal order in Boston in 1799. There are 143 hospitals in Massachusetts. In 2015, Massachusetts General Hospital was ranked in the top three in two health care specialties. Massachusetts General Hospital was founded in 1811 and serves as the largest teaching hospital for nearby Harvard University.

Massachusetts is a center for medical education and research, including Harvard affiliates Brigham and Women's Hospital, Beth Israel Deaconess Medical Center, and Dana–Farber Cancer Institute and the New England Baptist Hospital, Tufts Medical Center, and Boston Medical Center which is the primary teaching hospital for Boston University. The University of Massachusetts Chan Medical School is located in Worcester. The Massachusetts College of Pharmacy and Health Sciences has two of its three campuses in Boston and Worcester.

== Sports ==
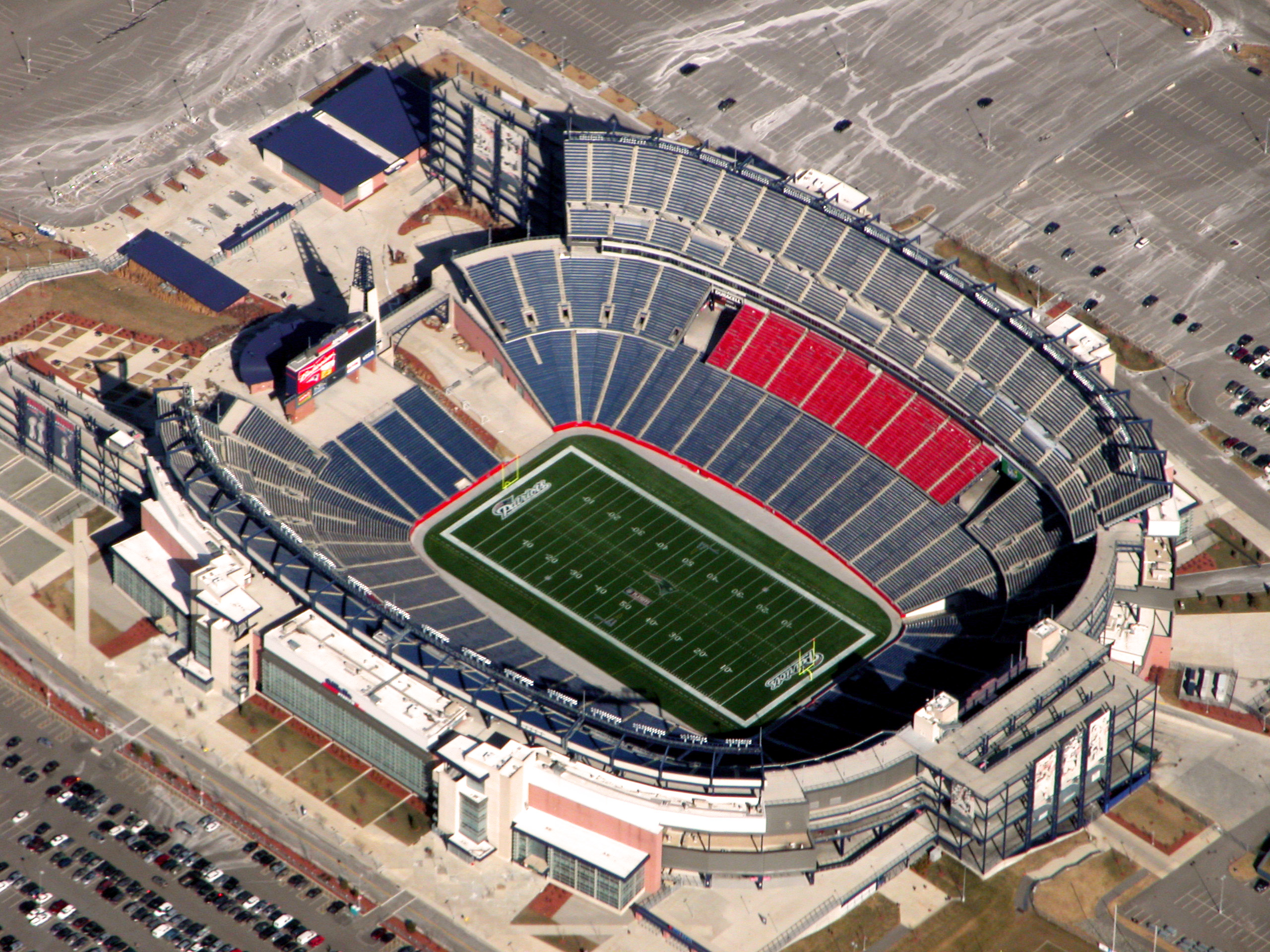
Gillette Stadium in Foxborough is the home venue for the New England Patriots (NFL) and the New England Revolution (MLS).

Massachusetts is home to five major league professional sports teams: eighteen-time NBA Champions Boston Celtics, nine-time World Series winners Boston Red Sox, six-time Stanley Cup winners Boston Bruins, six-time Super Bowl winners New England Patriots, and five-time MLS Cup finalists New England Revolution.

In the late 19th century, the Olympic sports of basketball and volleyball were invented in the Western Massachusetts cities of Springfield and Holyoke, respectively. The Basketball Hall of Fame is a major tourist destination in the City of Springfield and the Volleyball Hall of Fame is located in Holyoke. The American Hockey League (AHL), the NHL's development league, is headquartered in Springfield.

Several universities in Massachusetts are notable for their collegiate athletics. The state is home to two Division I FBS teams, Boston College of the Atlantic Coast Conference, and FBS Independent University of Massachusetts at Amherst. FCS play includes Harvard University, which competes in the famed Ivy League, and College of the Holy Cross of the Patriot League. Boston University, Northeastern University, UMASS Lowell, Stonehill College, and Merrimack College also participate in Division I athletics. Many other Massachusetts colleges compete in lower divisions such as Division III, where MIT, Tufts University, Amherst College, Williams College, and others field competitive teams.

Massachusetts is also the home of rowing events such as the Eastern Sprints on Lake Quinsigamond and the Head of the Charles Regatta. A number of major golf events have taken place in Massachusetts, including nine U.S. Opens and two Ryder Cups.

Massachusetts has produced several successful Olympians including Thomas Burke, James Connolly, and John Thomas (track and field); Butch Johnson (archery); Nancy Kerrigan (figure skating); Todd Richards (snowboarding); Albina Osipowich (swimming); Aly Raisman (gymnastics); Patrick Ewing (basketball); Stephen Nedoroscik (pommel horse); as well as Jim Craig, Mike Eruzione, Bill Cleary, Keith Tkachuk (ice hockey).

== See also ==
- Administrative divisions of Massachusetts
- Index of Massachusetts-related articles
- Outline of Massachusetts
- Massachusetts Bay Colony
- USS Massachusetts, 8 ships
- USRC Massachusetts, 2 ships

== Bibliography ==
- Barth, Jonathan Edward (2014). "'A Peculiar Stampe of Our Owne': The Massachusetts Mint and the Battle over Sovereignty, 1652–1691". The New England Quarterly. 87 (3): 490–525. doi:10.1162/TNEQ_a_00396. hdl:2286/R.I.26592. JSTOR 43285101. S2CID 57571000.
- Brebner, John Bartlet (1927). New England's Outpost: Acadia Before the Conquest of Canada. New York, NY: Columbia University Press. ISBN 978-0-7812-6367-2.
- Brettell, Caroline (2003). Anthropology and Migration:Essays on Transnational Ethnicity and Identity. Walnut Creek, CA: AltaMira Press. ISBN 978-0-7591-0320-7.
- Brown, Richard D; Tager, Jack (2000). Massachusetts: A Concise History. Amherst, MA: University of Massachusetts Press. ISBN 978-1-55849-248-6.
- Dejnozka, Edward L; Gifford, Charles S; Kapel, David E; Kapel, Marilyn B (1982). American Educators' Encyclopedia. Westport, CT: Greenwood Press. ISBN 978-0-313-20954-3.
- Goldfield, David; Abbott, Carl; Anderson, Virginia DeJohn; Argersinger, Jo Ann E; Argersinger, Peter H; Barney, William L; Weir, Robert M (1998). The American Journey—A History of the United States. Upper Saddle River, NJ: Prentice Hall. ISBN 978-0-13-656562-8.
- Koplow, David A (2004). Smallpox: The Fight to Eradicate a Global Scourge. Berkeley, CA: University of California Press. ISBN 978-0-520-24220-3.
- Sokolow, Alvin D (1997). "Town and Township Government: Serving Rural and Suburban Communities". Handbook of Local Government Administration. New York, NY: Marcel Dekker. ISBN 978-0-8247-9782-9.

Preceded by Connecticut	List of U.S. states by date of admission to the Union; Ratified Constitution on February 6, 1788 (6th)	Succeeded by Maryland
