= Indiana Arts Commission =

American state government agency

IAC
- Indiana Arts Commission
- Formation: July 1969
- Headquarters: 100 North Senate Avenue, Room N505, Indianapolis, IN 46204-2741
- Executive Director: Miah Michaelsen
- Deputy Director and Chief of Staff: André Zhang Sonera
- Website: www.in.gov/arts/

The Indiana Arts Commission (IAC) is a government agency that works in supporting and funding artists and art programs in Indiana. They also provide training and resources to the community and partner organizations, as well as research on the effects of their programs on people and communities and workshops to support work in the arts. They have grants available to apply to for funding the arts in Indiana cities and counties. Additionally, the IAC designates cultural areas/districts in Indiana, alongside the Indianapolis Historic Preservation Commission. There are 11 regional arts partners of the IAC. Each individual regional partner have their own grants that individuals and art groups in the region can apply to.

== History ==
The IAC was established in 1969. In 1997, it worked jointly with 12 community art organizations to provide help and funding to arts around the Indiana area, establishing the organizations as Regional Art Partners (RAP) of the IAC. Each Region was made up of a series of counties and had their own specific organization working with the IAC. Currently, there are 11 regional art partners, named 1-10 and skipping 11, the last being region 12.

The 2018 Indiana Arts Homecoming was held in October in Fort Wayne. It held 30 learning sessions and over 2 days, and contained an award ceremony for the arts.

== Grant and outreach programs ==
The IAC has two continuous art grant programs named the Arts Project Support (APS) and Arts Organization Support (AOS) grants. The APS grant allows applicants to request up to $4,000, and the AOS grant allows up to two years of project funding.

The IAC awarded $3.5 million to 338 art and culture-based non-profits over 77 counties in the two-year fiscal cycle that the grant program operates on in 2024. One of the awarded organizations that year was the Sullivan-Munce Cultural Center in Zionsville, which received $9,867 from both the AOS and the APS programs that same year. The next year, Columbia City Connect earned the $4,000 from the APS program.

In 2015, the Indiana Arts Commission opened up two new grant programs for the Indiana Bicentennial: Arts in the Parks and Indiana Masterpiece. Arts in the Parks offers up to $3,000, and Indiana Masterpiece offers up to $20,000.

In 2023, the IAC was given over $1 million in funding by the National Endowment for the Arts to provide grants to organizations throughout the state.

An Eskenazi Museum of Art outreach program, called the Eskenazi Museum of Art Look Club, receives analytic information and financial support from the IAC. It was formed in 2018, and has been functioning since then. The program provides art collections to rural elementary schools.

The Lifelong Arts Indiana program is an ongoing program in the IAC to understand art and culture and how it improves older people's physical and mental health, personal life, and social life.

== Regions ==
Region 1 is the Greater Gary area, run by the South Shore Arts Center based in Munster, IN. Region 2 is the Greater South Bend area, run by the Community Foundation of St. Joseph County based in South Bend, IN. Region 3 is the Greater Fort Wayne area, run by Arts United of Greater Fort Wayne, Inc based in Fort Wayne, IN. Region 4 is the Greater Lafayette area, run by The Arts Federation based in Lafayette, IN. Region 5 is the Greater Muncie area, run by the Community Foundation of Randolph County based in Winchester, IN. Region 6 is the Greater Terre Haute area, run by Arts Iliana in Terre Haute, IN. Region 7 is the Greater Indianapolis area, run by Noblesville Creates in Noblesville, IN. Region 8 is the Greater Bloomington area, run by Deanna Poelsma of Glazed & Confused Creations. Region 9 is the Greater Columbus area, run by the Columbus Area Arts Council based in Columbus, IN. Region 10 is the Greater Evansville area, run by the Arts Council of Southwestern Indiana based in Lakeville, IN. Region 12 is the Greater New Albany area, which is also run by Deanna Poelsma.

The City of Fisher's Nickel Plate District is one of 10 cultural districts designated by the state of Indiana. It was designated in 2018.
