= Flag of Indiana =

U.S. state flag

Indiana
- Use: Civil and state flag
- Proportion: 2:3
- Adopted: May 31, 1917; 109 years ago, standardized in 1955; 71 years ago.
- Design: On a blue background, a torch surrounded by an outer circle of thirteen stars, an inner semi circle of five stars, and a 19th large star at the top of the torch crowned by the word 'Indiana', all in gold. The flame of the torch has seven rays that emanate to seven stars.
- Designed by: Paul Hadley
- 3:5 aspect ratio
- Use: Civil and state flag
- Proportion: 3:5
- Adopted: May 31, 1917; 109 years ago, standardized in 1955; 71 years ago.
- Design: On a blue background, a torch surrounded by an outer circle of thirteen stars, an inner semi circle of five stars, and a 19th large star at the top of the torch crowned by the word 'Indiana', all in gold. The flame of the torch has seven rays that emanate to seven stars.
- Designed by: Paul Hadley

The flag of Indiana was adopted on May 31, 1917, as the third official flag of the U.S. state of Indiana. Designed by Paul Hadley, it has remained unchanged since its adoption, with specifications standardized in 1955. Prior to 1955, it was referred to as the state's official banner.

== Design and specifications ==
=== Statute ===
The 2011 Indiana Code, IC 1-2-2-1 defines that the flag shall be of the following design and dimensions:

"three (3) feet fly by two (2) feet hoist; or five (5) feet fly by three (3) feet hoist; or any size proportionate to either of those dimensions. The field of the flag shall be blue with nineteen (19) stars and a flaming torch in gold or buff. Thirteen (13) stars shall be arranged in an outer circle, representing the original thirteen (13) states; five (5) stars shall be arranged in a half circle below the torch and inside the outer circle of stars, representing the states admitted prior to Indiana; and the nineteenth star, appreciably larger than the others and representing Indiana shall be placed above the flame of the torch. The outer circle of stars shall be so arranged that one (1) star shall appear directly in the middle at the top of the circle, and the word 'Indiana' shall be placed in a half circle over and above the star representing Indiana and midway between it and the star in the center above it. Rays shall be shown radiating from the torch to the three (3) stars on each side of the star in the upper center of the circle."

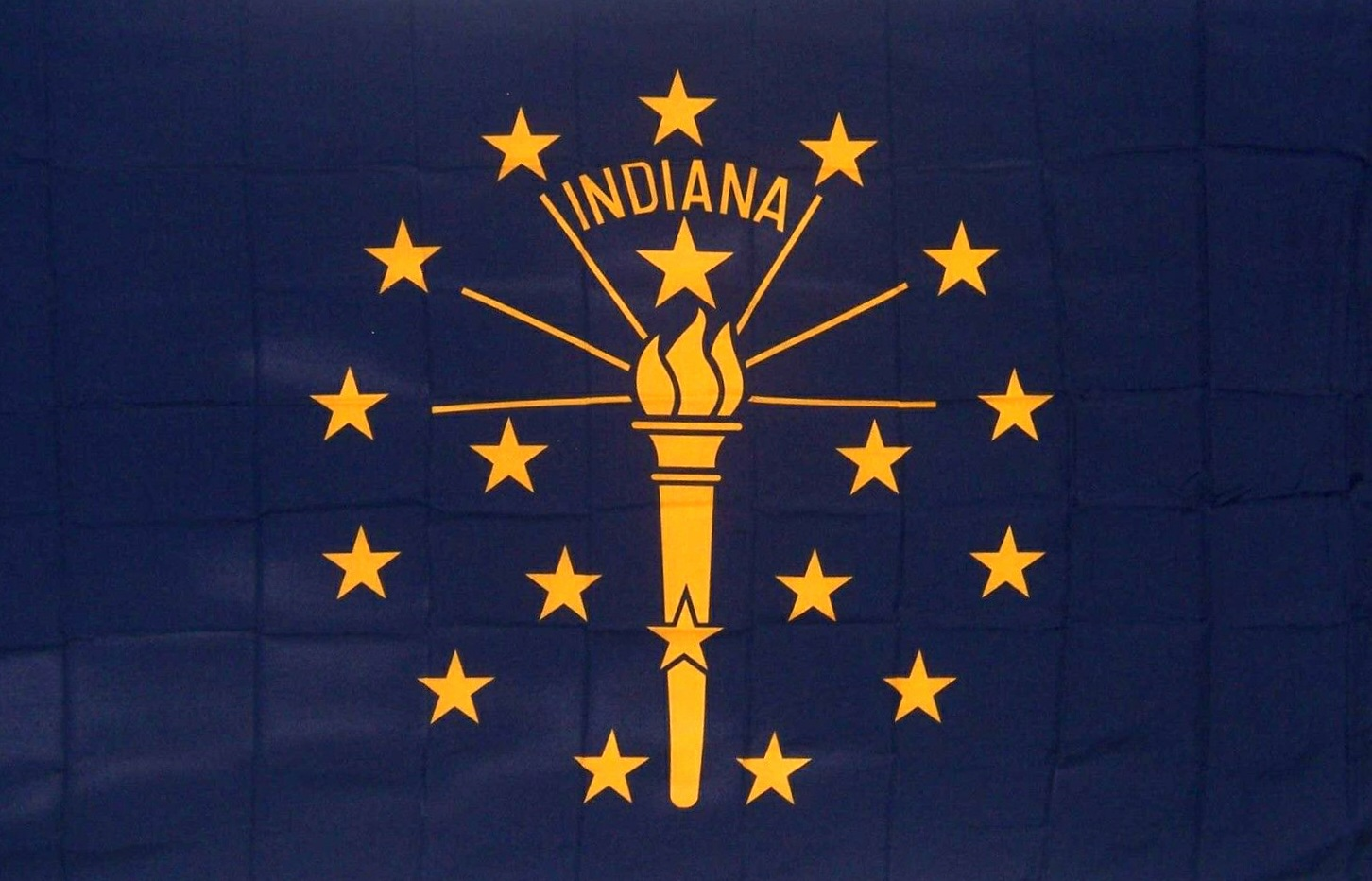
An example of a state flag with only six rays.

Despite the flag code only specifying for there to be six rays on the flag, many copies of the state flag place an additional ray in between the torch and the large star. The addition of a seventh ray matches Paul Hadley's original flag design. Still, some flags may only use six rays.

=== Symbolism ===
The flag consists of a gold torch that represents liberty & enlightenment; the rays around the torch represent their far-reaching influence. The nineteen stars represent Indiana's place as the nineteenth state to join the United States. The thirteen stars in the outer loop symbolize the original Thirteen Colonies, the five inner stars represent the next five states added to the Union, and the one large star above the torch represents Indiana.

=== Colors ===
Although there are no official shades of blue, gold or buff, the Indiana Historical Bureau uses hex codes #000F5D (blue) and #D59F0F (gold) for digital files, and they use Pantone 072C (blue) and 109C (gold) for printing or painting.

IHB hex colors
Color	Web color	RGB Values
Blue	#000F5D	(0,15,93)
Gold	#D59F0F	(213,159,15)

IHB Pantone colors
Color	Pantone color	RGB Values
Blue	072C	(16,6,159)
Gold	109C	(255,209,0)

=== Usage ===
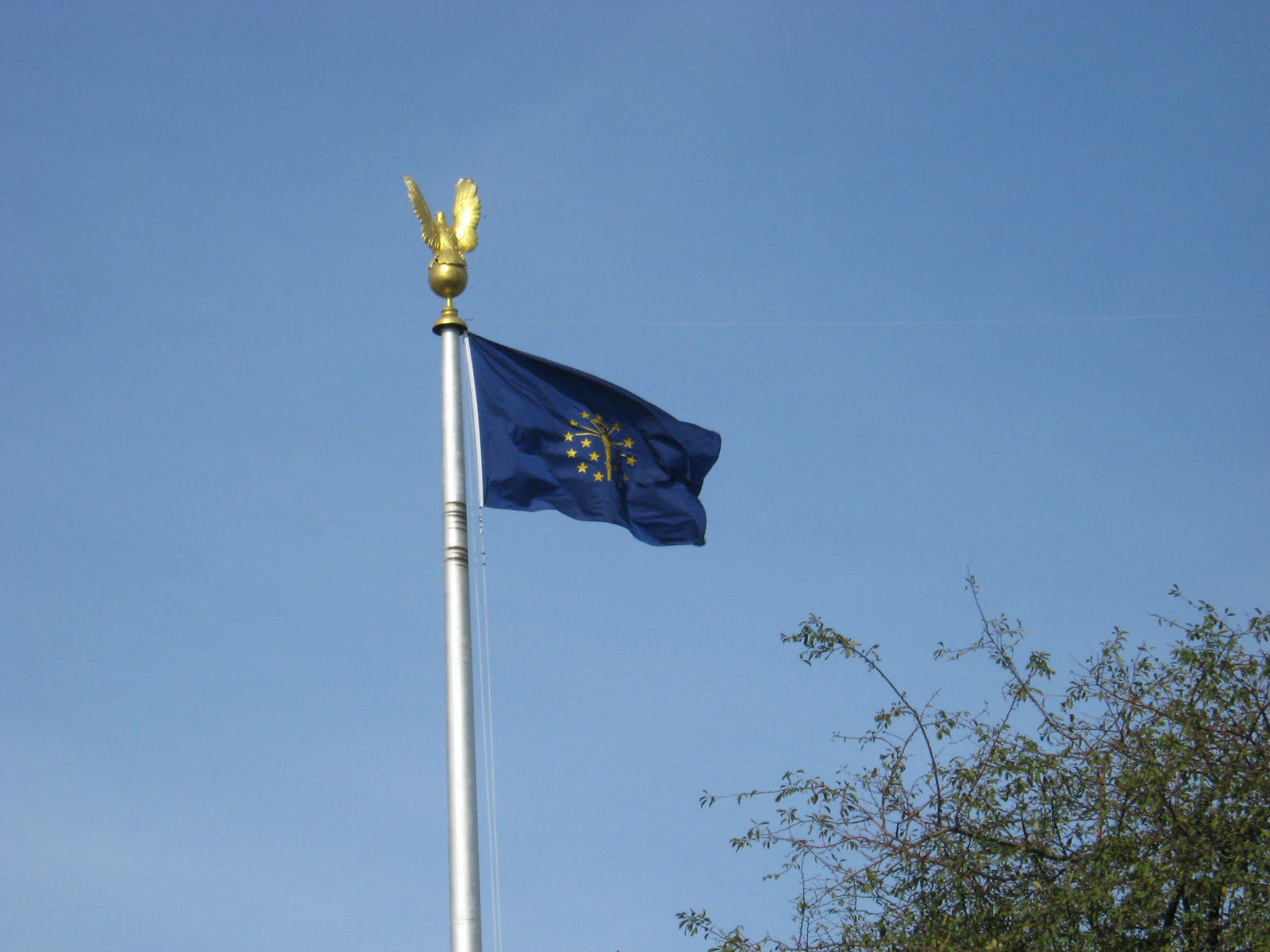
Indiana state flag flying at the Indiana World War Memorial.

Several laws govern the use of the state flag:

The flag is required to be flown by all state militias and the Indiana National Guard. It is to be on display at the Indiana Statehouse at all times, and a new and different state flag is required to replace the previous flag each day whenever doing so would be feasible and practicable. The flag must also be displayed at any agency that is funded in part or in full by the state government, including public schools, state universities, and state parks. When the state flag is in too poor of a condition that it is not fitting for display, the flag should be honorably destroyed using the same method provided for the retiring and disposing of the flag of the United States. In all other respects, the Indiana state flag should be treated with the same care and respect as the flag of the United States.

== History ==
=== First flag ===
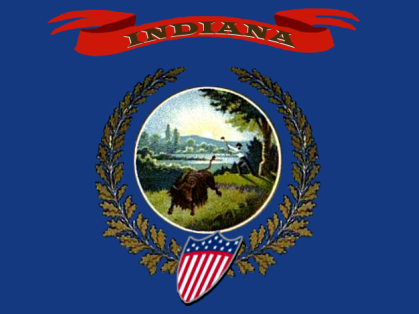
First official flag of Indiana (1885–1901)

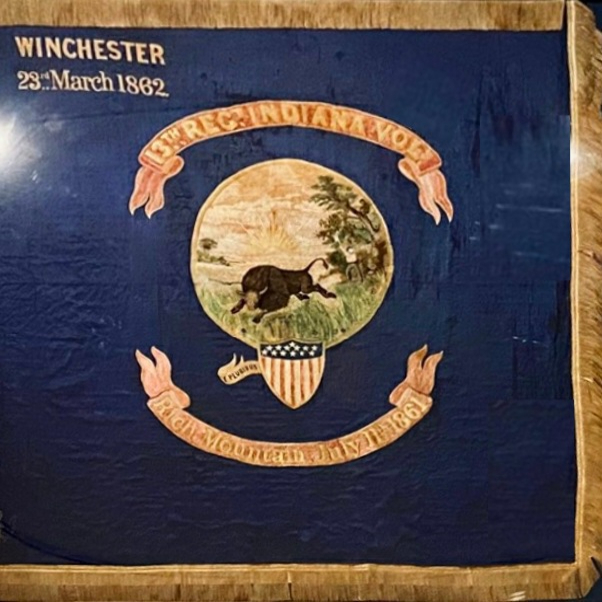
Battle flag flown during the American Civil War, featuring symbols later used on the first state flag.

On February 21, 1885, each state was asked to dedicate a state flag for the Washington Monument. At the time, Indiana lacked a state flag, and so the Indiana government had authorized Eliza Callis, the State Librarian for the Indiana State Library, to produce the first Indiana state flag. The flag was also carried during President Cleveland inauguration.

The design depicted the seal of Indiana wrapped in an oak leaf wreath, a star-spangled shield with 13 stars and stripes below the seal, and a red scroll above the seal bearing the state's name.

In 1893, when Benjamin Harrison came to Indianapolis, the flag was flown to celebrate his arrival. In 1901, a fair was held in Indianapolis in which it was displayed.

Prior to the adoption of the state flag, a battle flag of near identical design was flown to represent the 13th Indiana Infantry Regiment during the American Civil War.

=== Second flag ===
Second official flag of Indiana (1901–1955); the United States flag.

In 1901, Senate Bill 239 of Chapter 150 in Laws of the State of Indiana sought to make the flag of the United States the official state flag of Indiana. This Act passed at the Sixty-Second Regular Session of the General Assembly, and was put into effect on March 9, 1901, when Governor Winfield Durbin signed the bill into law. This Act lasted until 1955 when the Indiana General Assembly amended the Act, officially recognizing Paul Hadley's flag design as the state flag.

The bill read as follows:

WHEREAS, The State of Indiana has no flag; and

WHEREAS, The flag of the United States is recognized as the flag of every State and Territory composing the United States; therefore

SECTION 1. Be it enacted by the General Assembly of the State of Indiana, That said flag of the United States, representing each State with a star in a blue field, be and is hereby adopted as the flag of the State of Indiana.

=== Current flag ===
To commemorate the state's 1916 centennial anniversary, the Indiana General Assembly issued a resolution to adopt a new state flag. At the request of the General Assembly, a contest was sponsored by the Indiana Society of the Daughters of the American Revolution to design a flag to serve as the official state banner. As an incentive to increase the number of submissions, the contest offered the winner a $100 cash prize. More than 200 submissions were received and examined by the Society before a winner was selected. The entry created by Paul Hadley of Mooresville, Indiana was ultimately chosen as the winner of the contest and the cash prize.

On May 31, 1917, the flag was chosen as the state's official banner. The General Assembly made only one change to Hadley's original design: they added the name Indiana, in a crescent shape, over the top of the large star. The state banner was five feet six inches in width by four feet four inches in height. The state banner was later designated as the state flag in a statute passed in 1955 that also standardized the dimensions of the flag to be 2 by 3 units, 3 by 5 units, or any equivalent size.

The Indiana state banner as designed by Paul Hadley with the state name omitted.

Banner of Indiana (1917–1955)

Current flag of Indiana after standardization (1955–present)
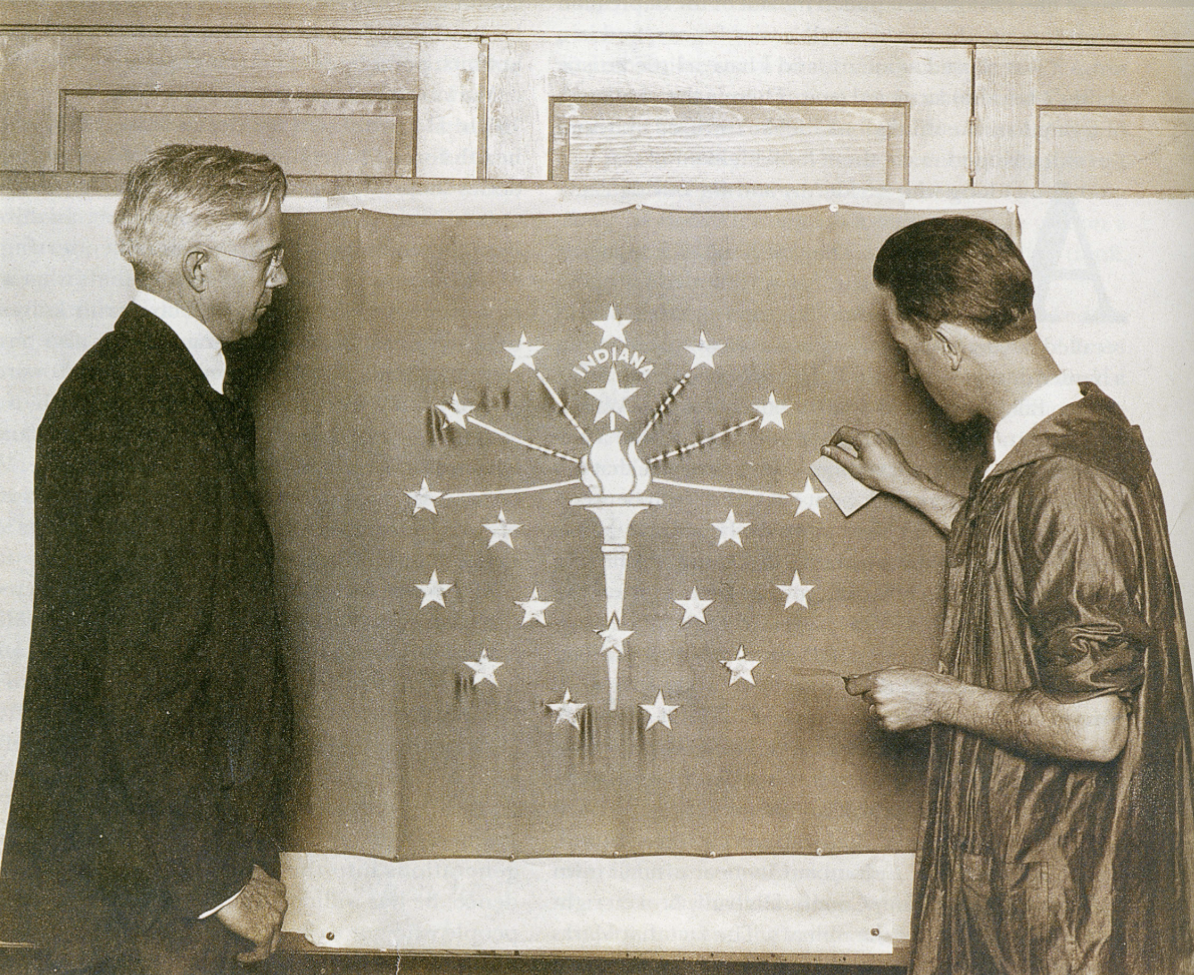
Paul Hadley (left) with the flag that was given to the state, 1923.

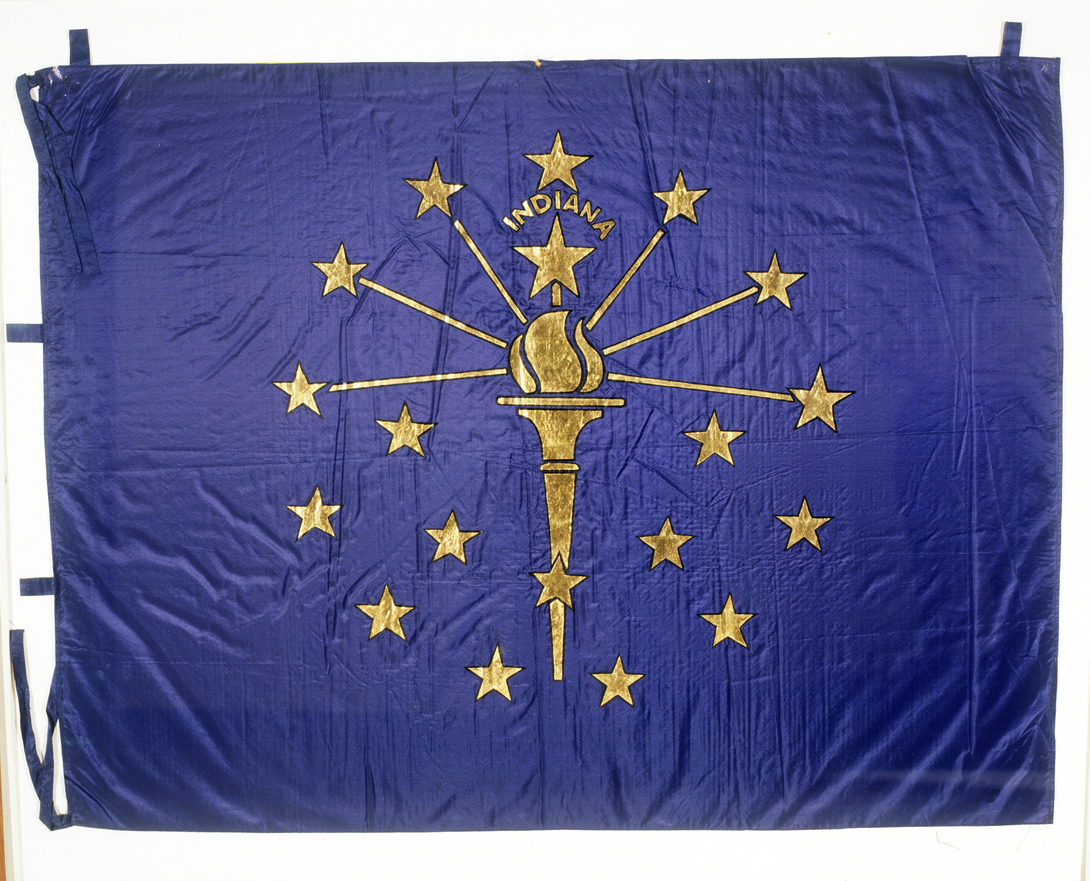
The first Indiana flag after adoption to be used by the state government. This flag was created by Paul Hadley to be used at the Indiana Statehouse in 1923.

=== Other flags ===
The George Rogers Clark Flag was created and solely flown in Vincennes, Indiana in 1778. This flag is the only documented non-national flag used to represent the Territory of Indiana. The Indiana Society of the Sons of the American Revolution have adopted the George Rogers Clark flag as their flag, and in 2008, they presented the flag to the Indiana National Guard to take with them to Iraq and Afghanistan. The flag is still being flown in Vincennes to this day.

The symbols on the Indiana state flag were used as the theming for the Indiana Bicentennial Torch Relay in 2016. The torch on the Indiana state flag had a physical version of it created to be specially used for the event. In 2015, one year before the event, a bicentennial flag was created to celebrate Indiana's 200th statehood anniversary. The bicentennial flag has the state flag incorporated into its design. Copies of the bicentennial flag were given to every county, city, and town in the state to be displayed. The flag was sold on the official state website and in retail stores for a limited time during the bicentennial event.

The George Rogers Clark Flag

Indiana semicentennial flag, 1866

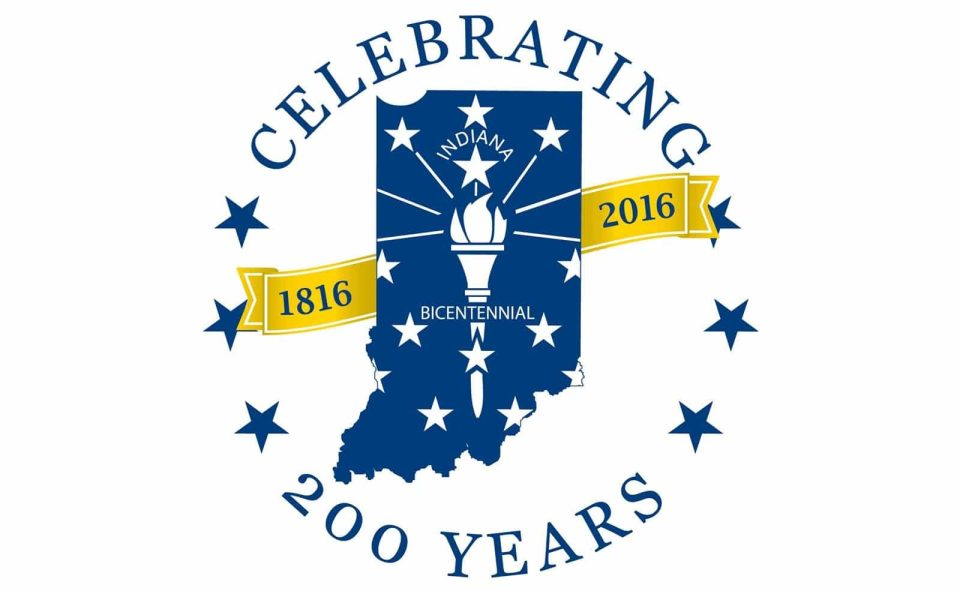
Indiana bicentennial flag

== Flag proposals ==
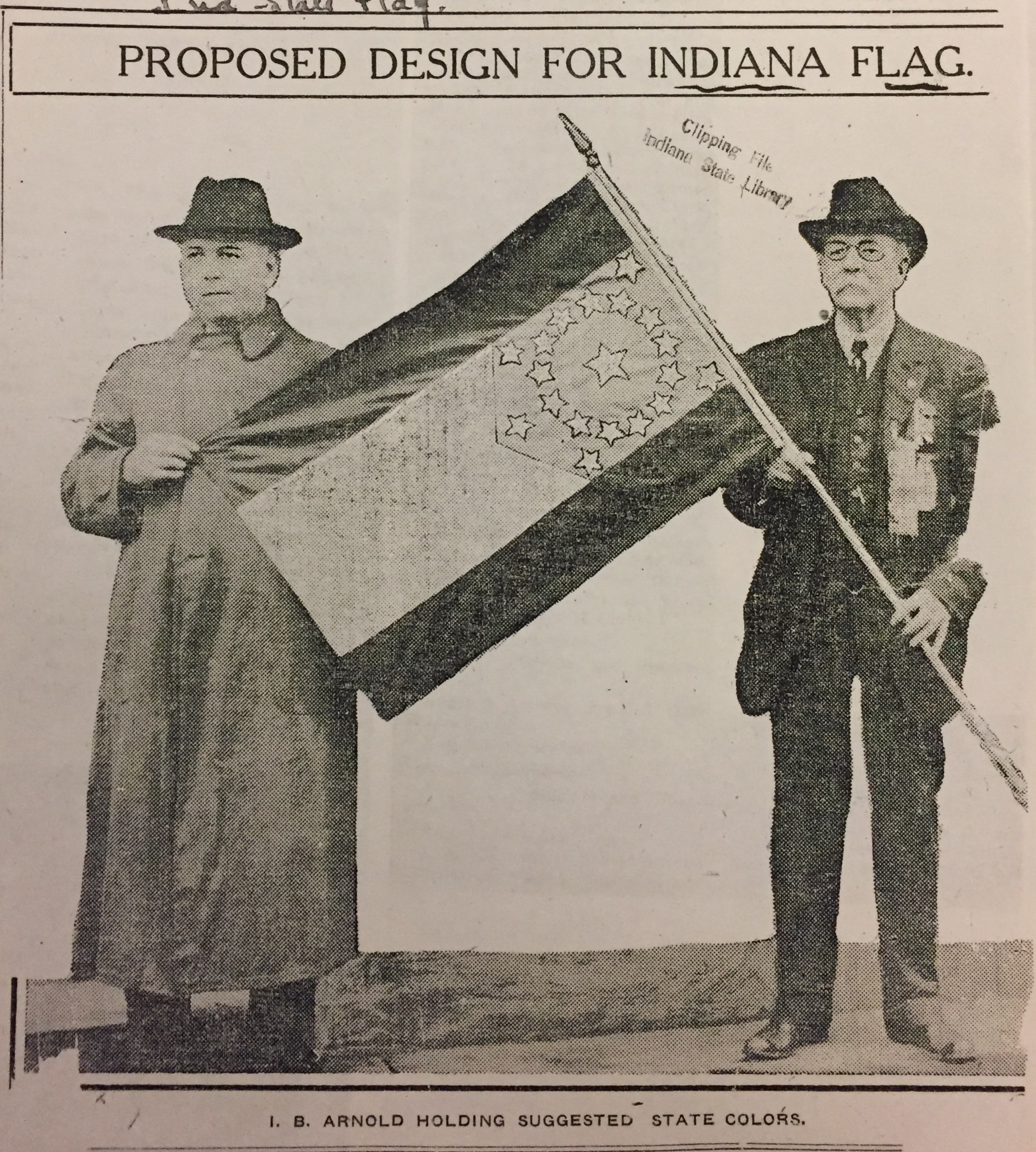
Irwin B. Arnold holding his flag proposal, 1914.

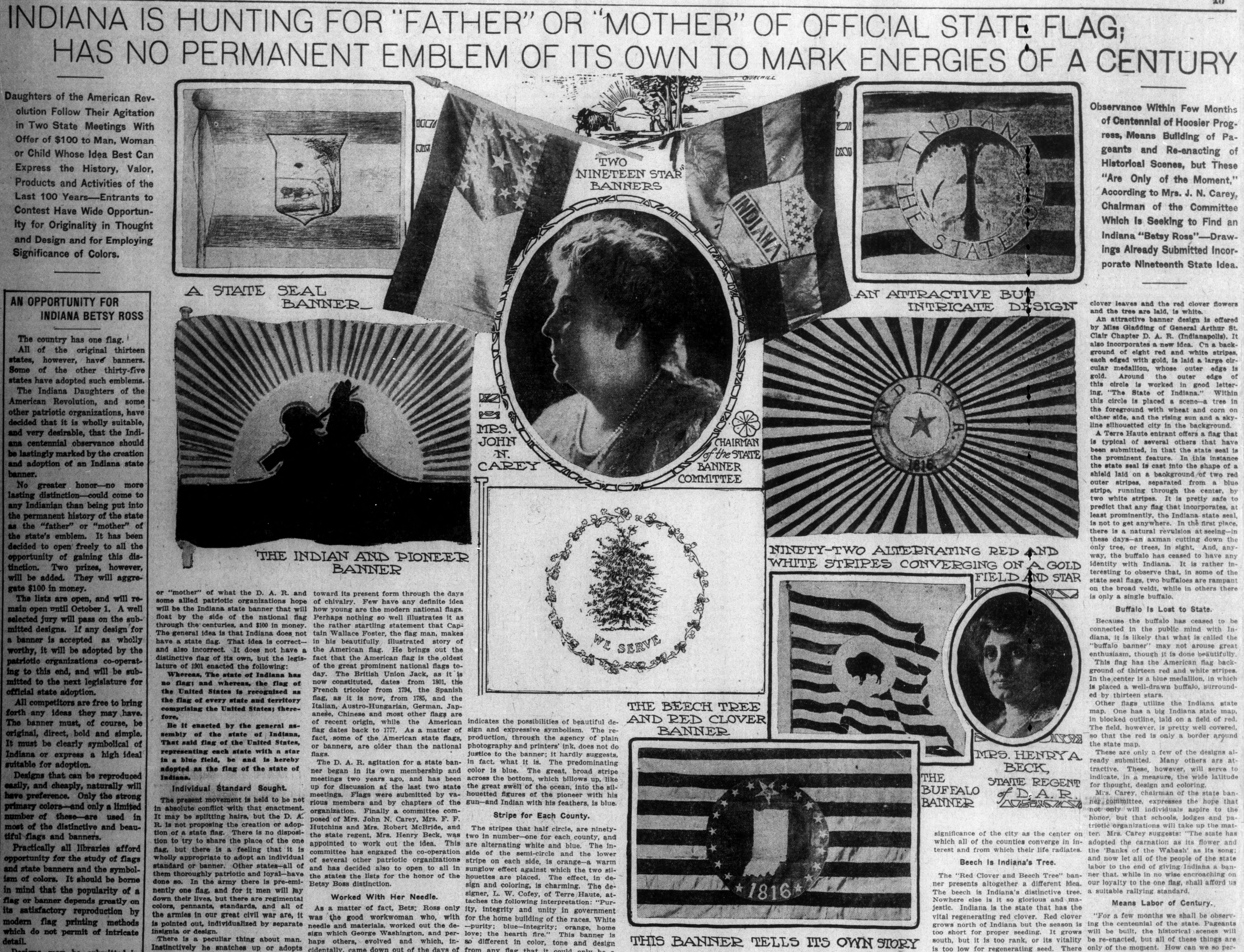
Depiction of several proposal flags in The Indianapolis News, 1916.

The first person to propose a flag for the state was Irwin Burnett Arnold in 1914. Irwin, being an American Civil War veteran, with the help of his wife designed a flag that was similar to the United States flag. Despite the design, many other Civil War veterans, whom Irwin hoped would endorse his flag, had ridiculed the flag. Some of these veterans, in response to Irwin's flag proposal, proclaimed their support of the United States flag being the official state flag of Indiana for which it was at the time. Irwin would later get into contact with the Indiana Daughters of the American Revolution who were more open to making his flag the official state flag. The Indiana DAR had planned a vote to decide if they would pursue promoting state flag legislation, but upon hearing from the Secretary of State Lew G. Ellingham that Indiana already had a state flag, the vote was delayed. Despite these setbacks, Irwin continued to promote his flag in hope of it possibly becoming the official state flag.

In 1916, to celebrate the centennial anniversary of Indiana's statehood, William Chauncy Langdon created a centennial flag to be used in pageants across the state. These pageants were reenactments of the past 100 years of Indiana's history. Langdon's centennial flag was meant to symbolize Indiana. Langdon designed the flag based on his own principles that a flag should be simple, attractive, acceptable as a flag, significant, and that it contrasts yet harmonizes with the United States flag. Langdon made the flag a tricolor, a common design on European national flags, specifically the French and Italian flags. Langdon sent a letter to Indiana governor Samuel M. Ralston where he offered to gift his centennial flag. In the letter, Langdon referred to his flag as the state flag. Langdon also sent a similar letter to the Indiana Daughters of the American Revolution.

The idea of a statewide flag contest was first raised at the annual state DAR conference in 1915. To commemorate the state's 1916 centennial anniversary, the Indiana General Assembly issued a resolution to adopt a new state flag. At the request of the General Assembly, a contest was sponsored by the Indiana Society of the Daughters of the American Revolution to design a flag to serve as the official state banner. This contest had received over 200 flag submissions, including several flags designed by Paul Hadley. Of the flag submissions, only a few of them are known to have been documented.

Irwin B. Arnold's flag and William C. Langdon's flag both predate the 1916 flag contest, and they were likely inspirations for Paul Hadley's flag design.

Irwin Burnett Arnold's Flag, 1914

William Chauncy Langdon's Centennial Flag, 1916

The Indian and Pioneer Banner (Unknown Author)

The Beech Tree and Red Clover Banner (Unknown Author)

The Buffalo Banner (Unknown Author)

Sydney Elizabeth Lyon's (Jeffersonville) Flag

Mrs. K. F. Brook's (Plymouth) Flag

Charles Carroll's (Delphi) Flag

Miss Gladding's (Indianapolis) Flag

Unknown Author (Terre Haute)

Unknown Author

== Usage in popular culture ==
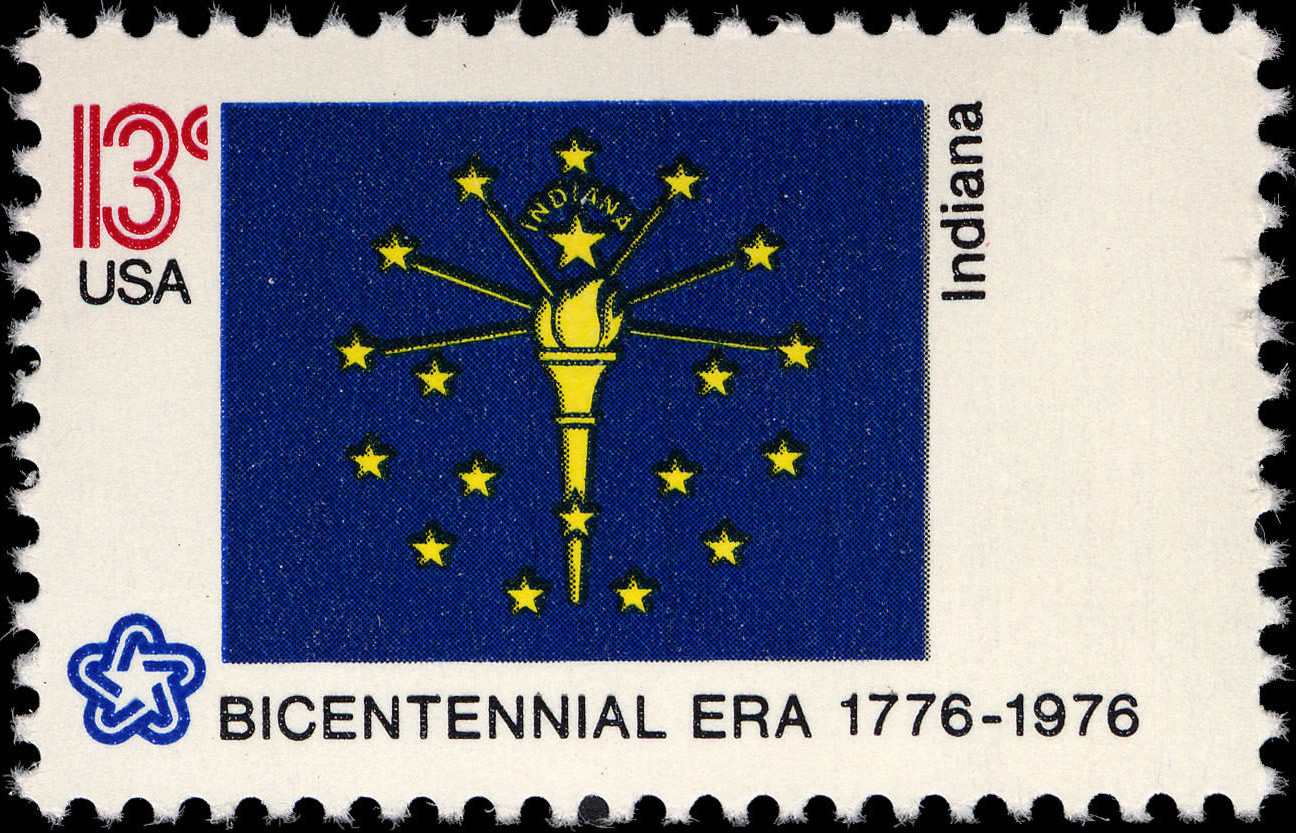
The Indiana state flag as depicted in the 1976 bicentennial postage stamp series

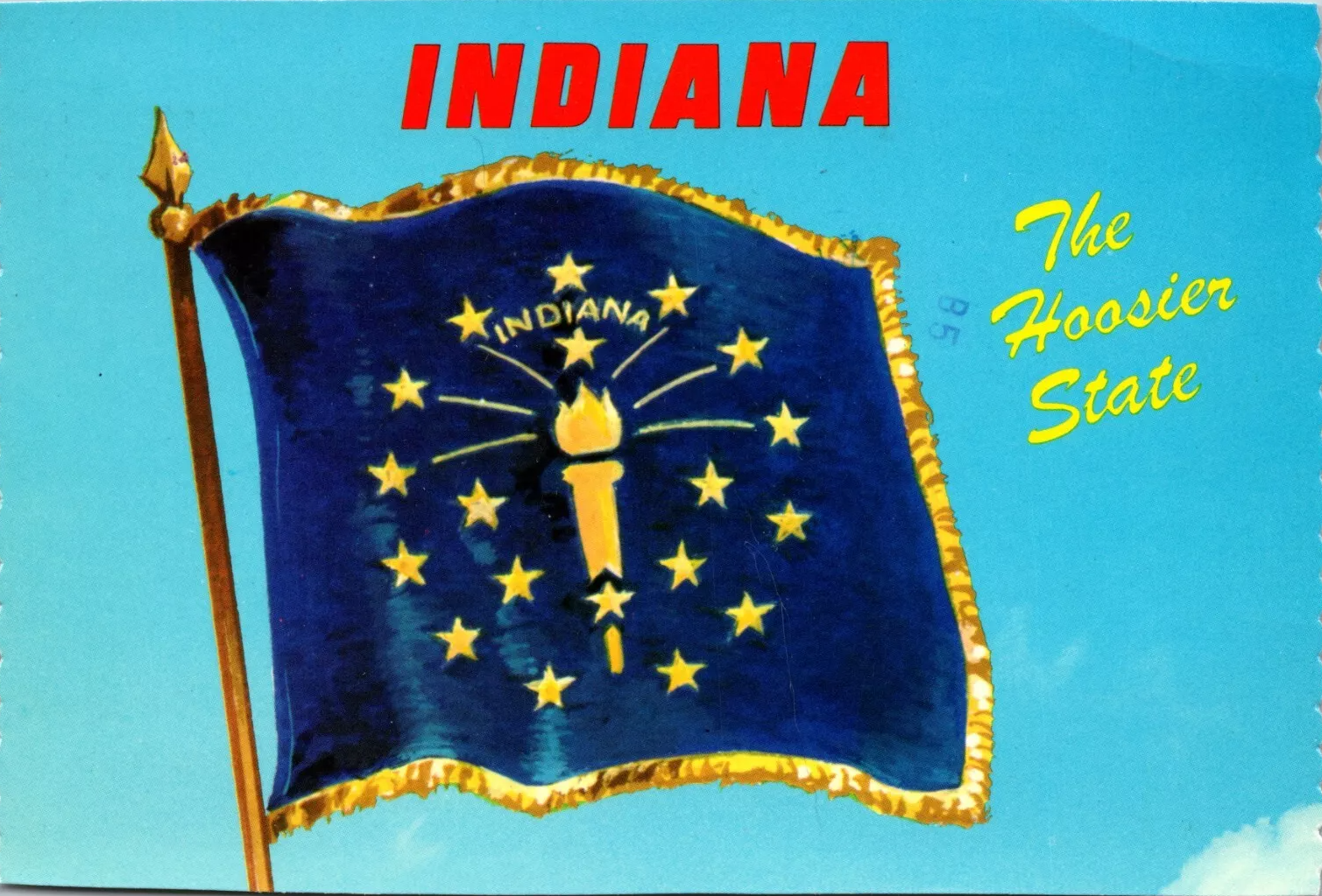
The Indiana state flag shown in a 1980 Indianapolis post card

A large variety of things utilize the colors and symbols of the state flag. This includes Indiana state agency logos and seals, college logos, private business logos, license plates, monuments, art pieces, and flags and seals of counties and municipalities in Indiana just to list a few.

The team colors for the NBA's Indiana Pacers were taken from the blue and gold of the flag.

In late 2008, Bloomington-licensed CW affiliate WTTV used the Indiana state flag in their station logo until 2015 when they became a CBS affiliate, though the logo remains in use for their second digital subchannel.

The logo of the BP-acquired Amoco Corporation (formerly Standard Oil of Indiana) prominently features a torch to commemorate the company's Hoosier origins; it remains in use at the few BP stations using Amoco and Standard trade dress to maintain trademark protection.

A variation of the Indiana state flag was used as the Gotham flag in the 1989 movie Batman. The flag can be seen in the mayor's office.

In 2001, a survey conducted by the North American Vexillological Association (NAVA) placed Indiana's flag 32nd in design quality out of the 72 Canadian provincial, U.S. state and U.S. territorial flags ranked.

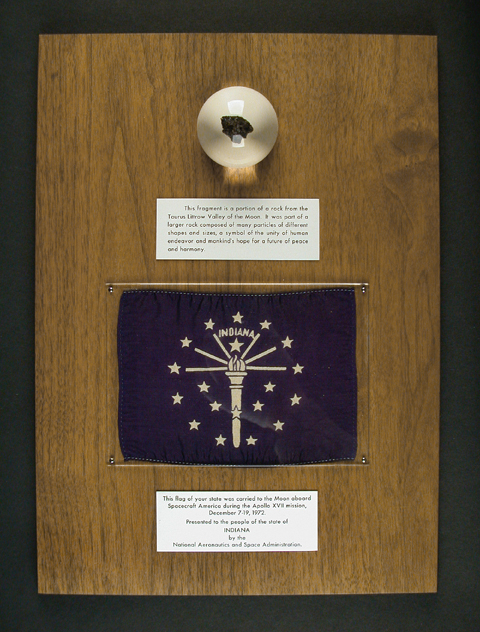
Apollo 17 display case with the state flag and a moon basalt rock.

After the Apollo 11 moon landing, a display case containing the state flag and 0.05 grams of space dust was created by NASA and presented to Governor Edgar D. Whitcomb. The display case remains on display at the Indiana State Museum.

In 1973, a piece of Lunar basalt 70017 was given to the state of Indiana by President Richard Nixon. A display case was created containing the piece of lunar basalt. Also on this display case, below the rock, is a copy of the state flag that had been carried to the Moon aboard Spacecraft America during the Apollo 17 mission.

== Gallery ==
=== Historical depictions ===
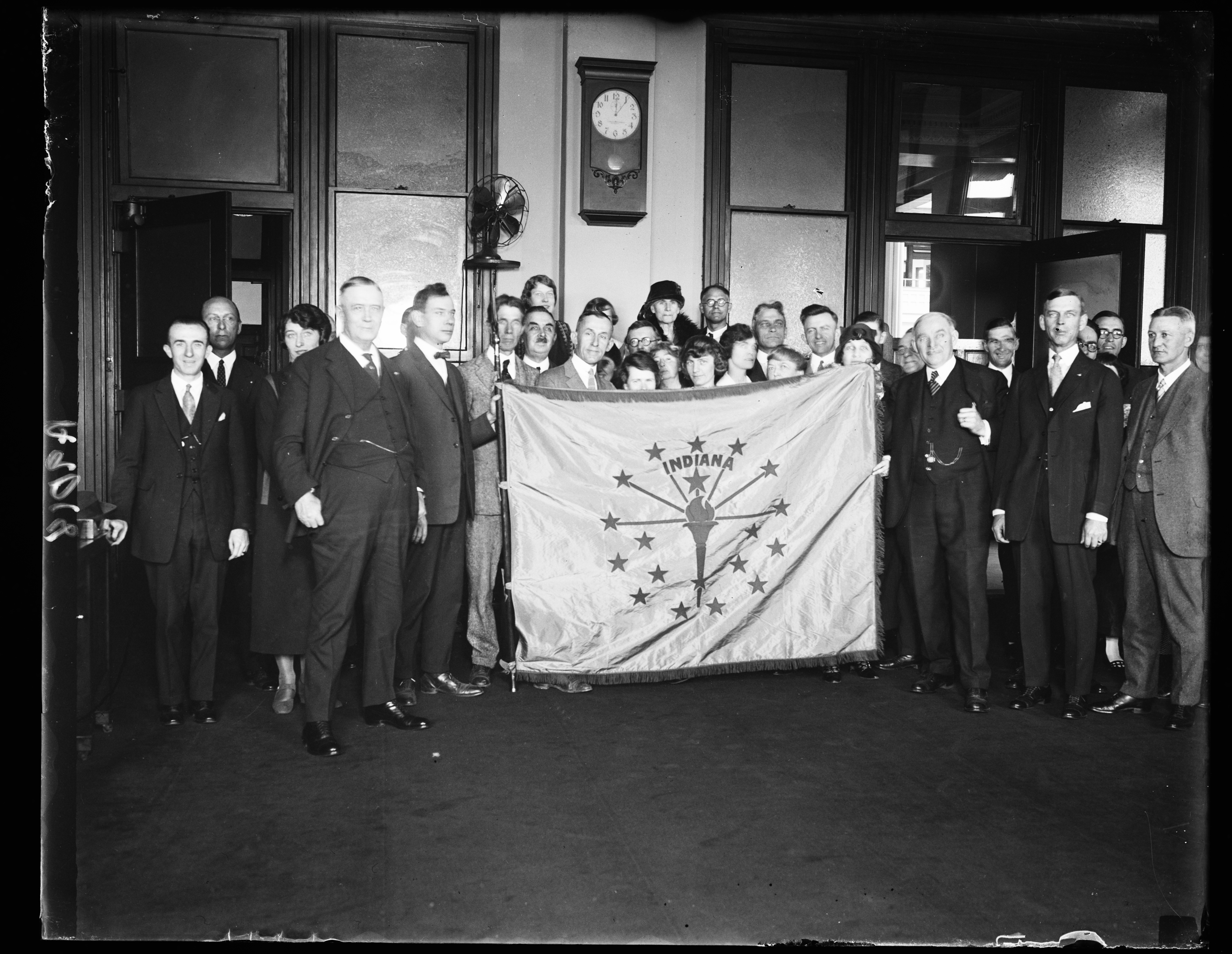
Presentation of the state flag, 1924.

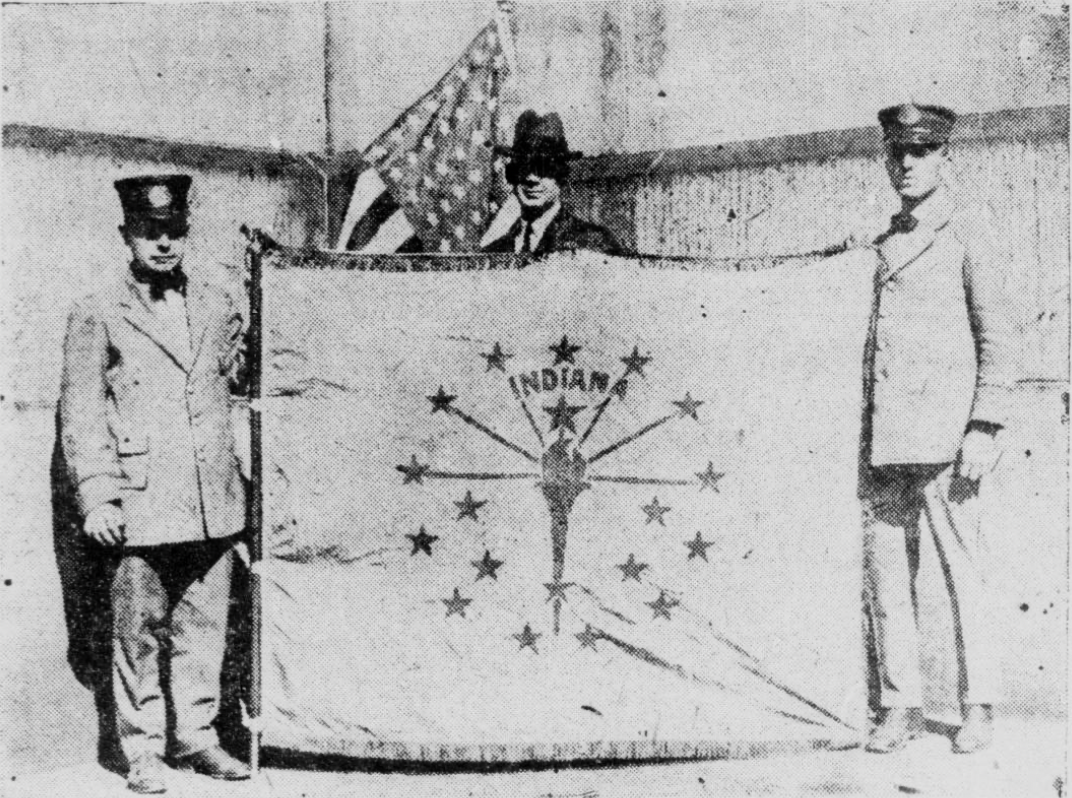
State flag given to the Postoffice Department building in Washington D.C., 1924

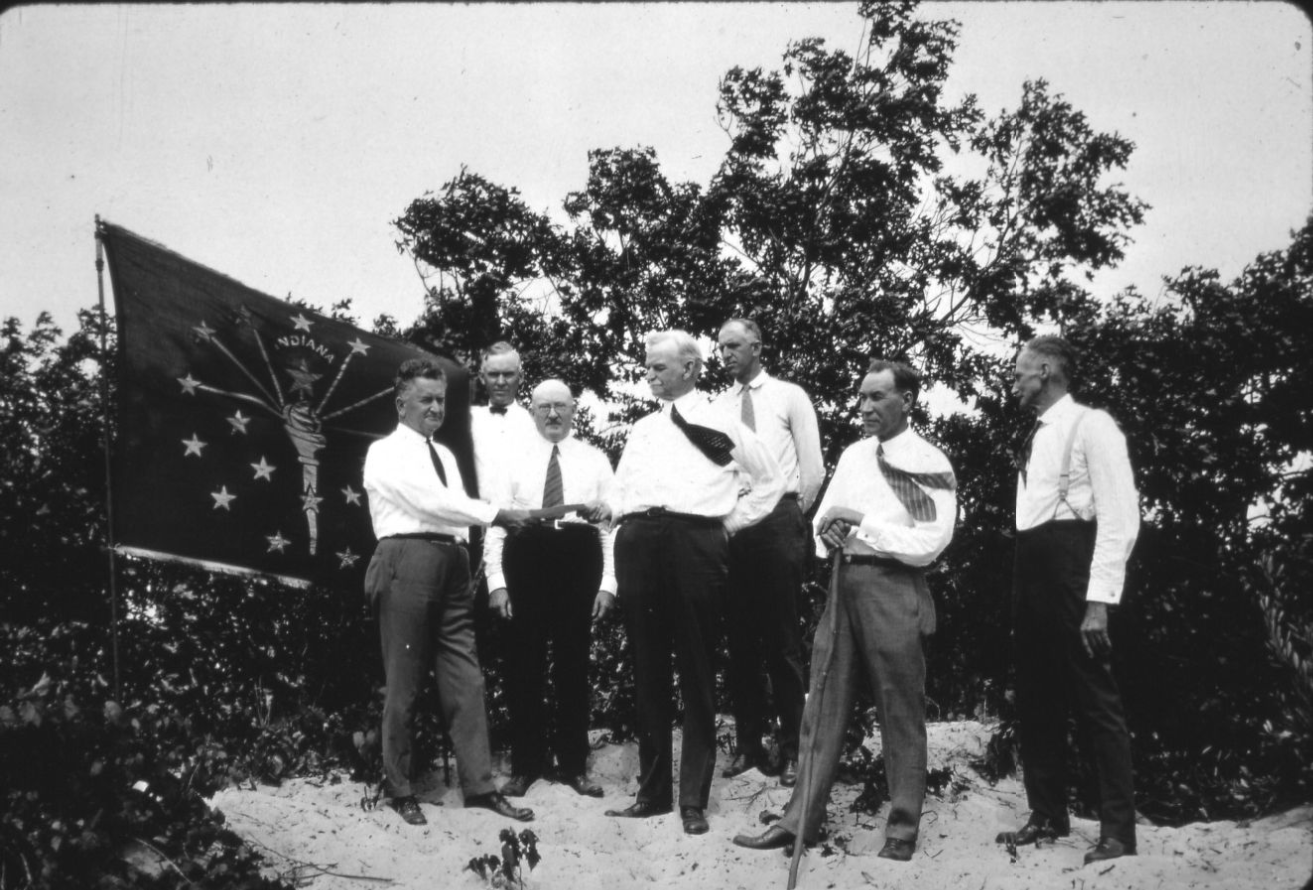
The state banner next to Governor Ed Jackson as he presents the deed of the first purchase of the Indiana Dunes State Park, 1925.

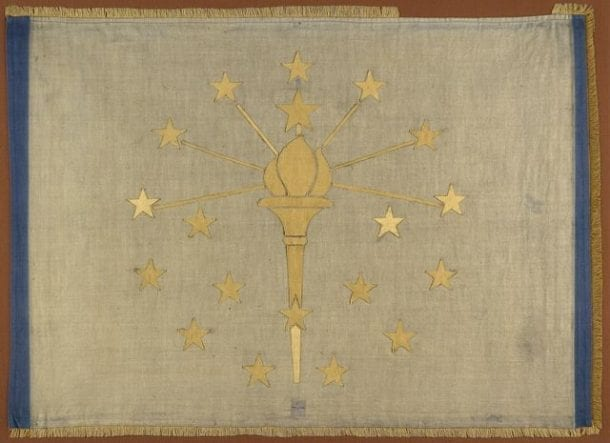
Paul Hadley's original flag proposal. This flag is in possession of the Indiana State Museum.

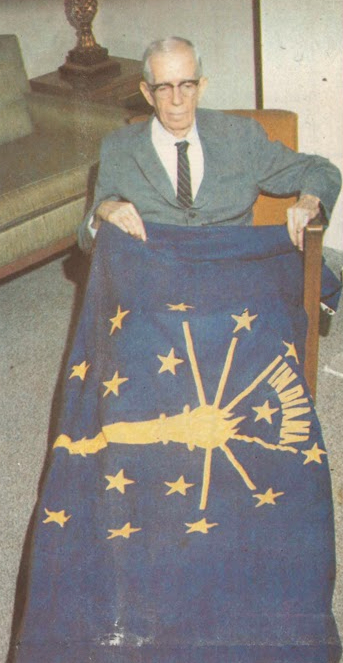
Paul Hadley with his creation, 1969.

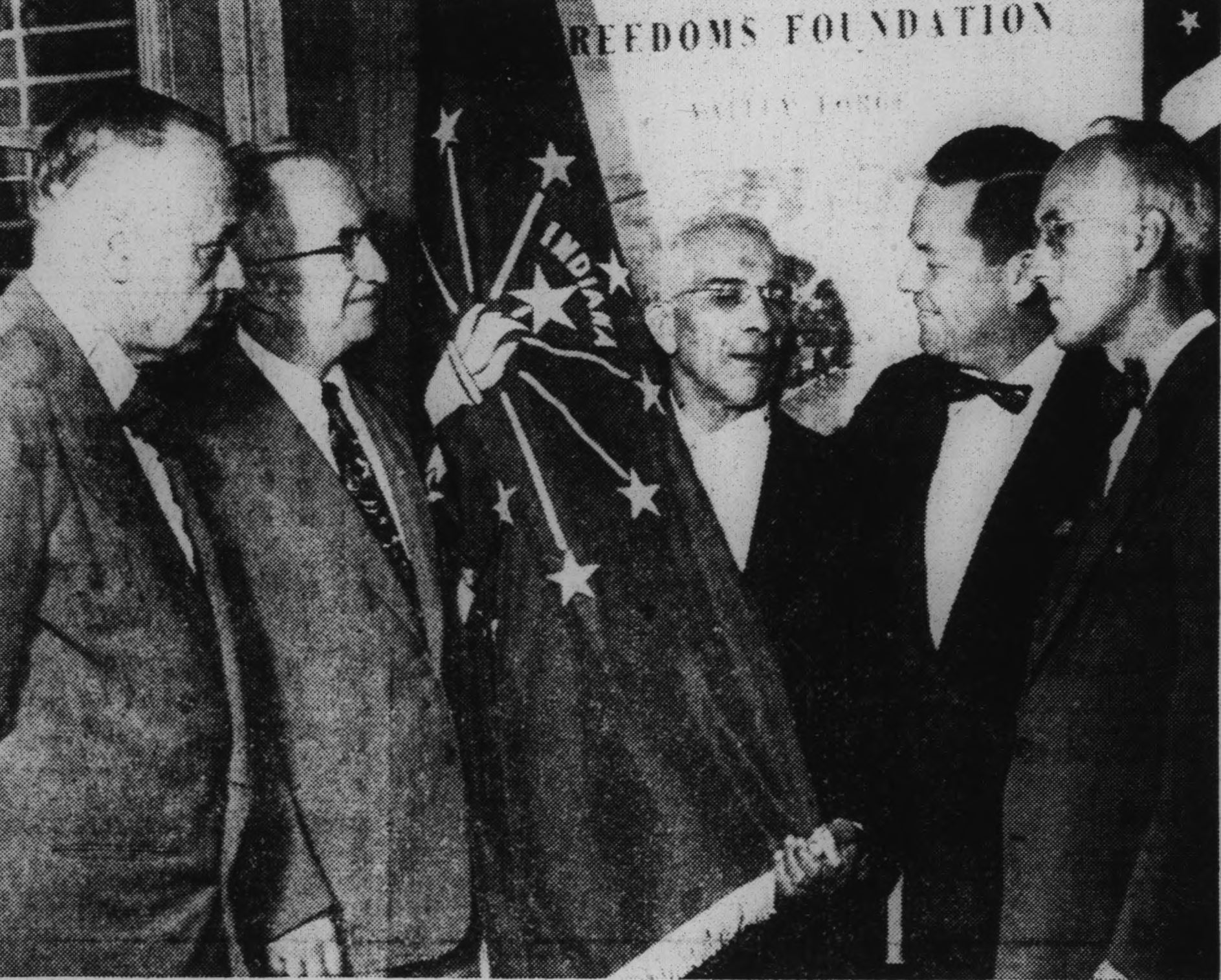
Supreme Court Justice James Emmert and Mayor gar Stahl gather around the state flag presented at a Freedoms Foundation exhibit opened at Manual High School, 1955.

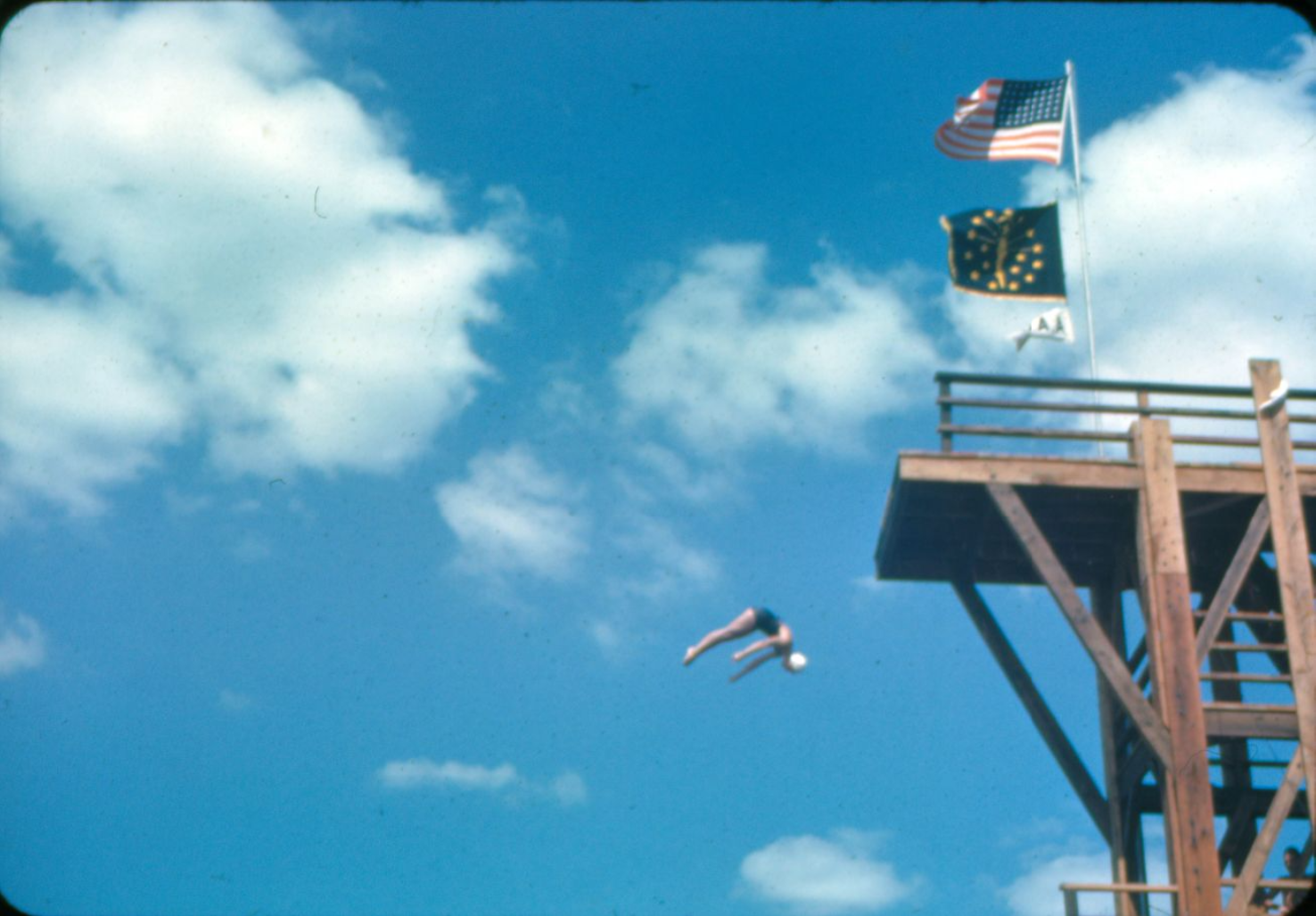
The state banner at a Shakamak diving competition, 1942.

=== Modern depictions ===
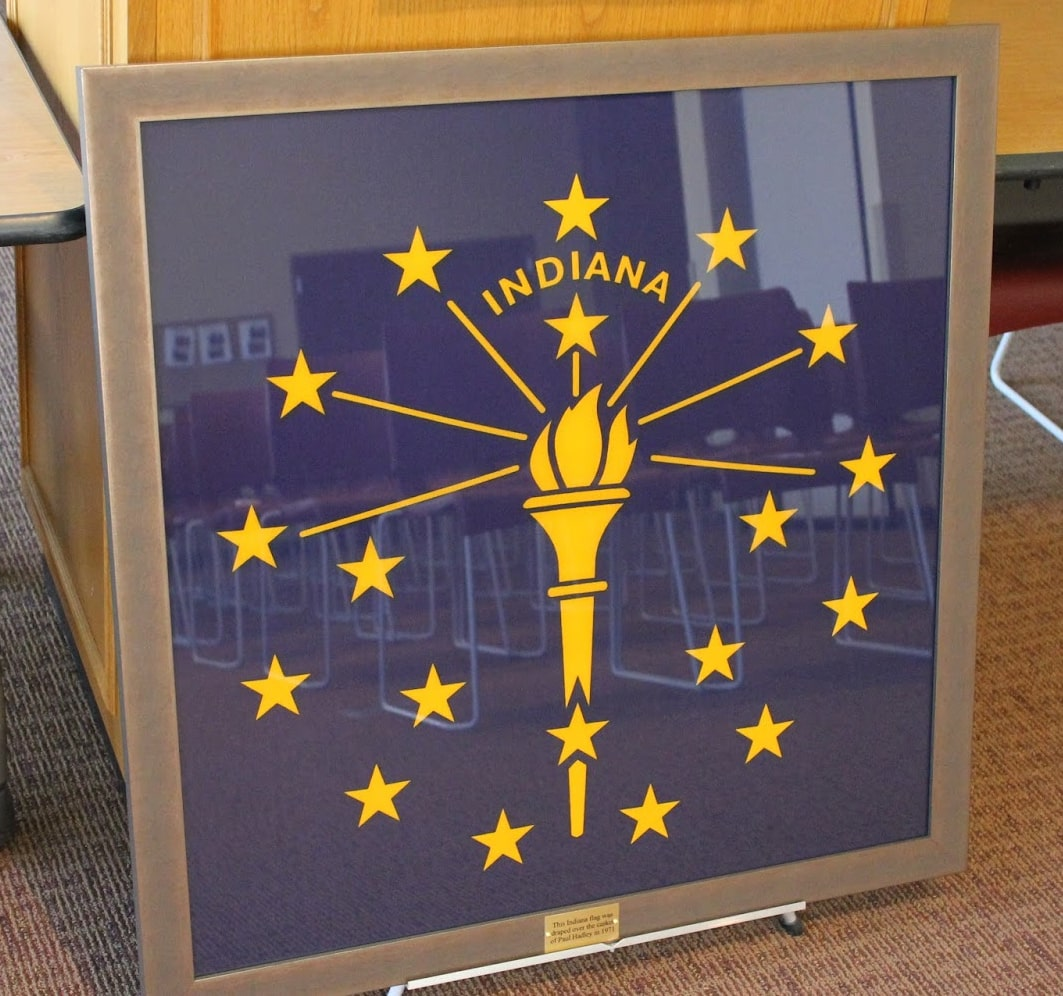
Indiana state flag that was draped over Paul Hadley's coffin in 1971.

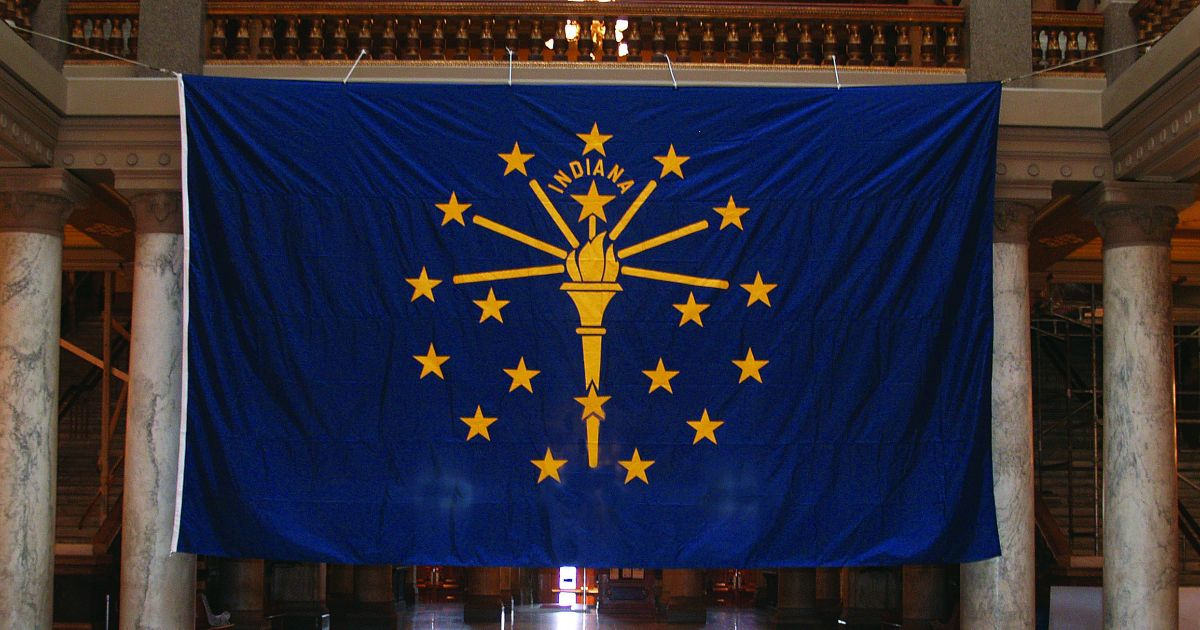
Giant Indiana state flag held at the Indiana Statehouse.

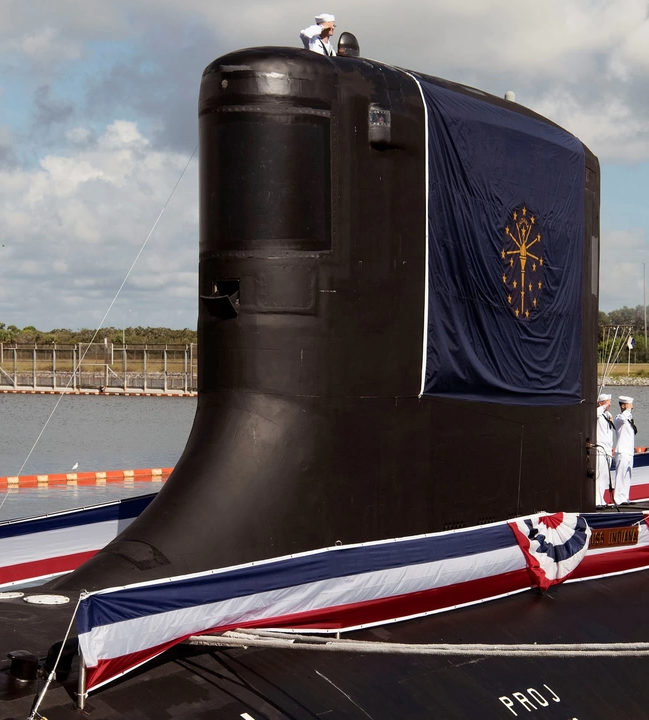
Large state flag at the commissioning ceremony for the USS Indiana submarine in Port Canaveral, Florida.

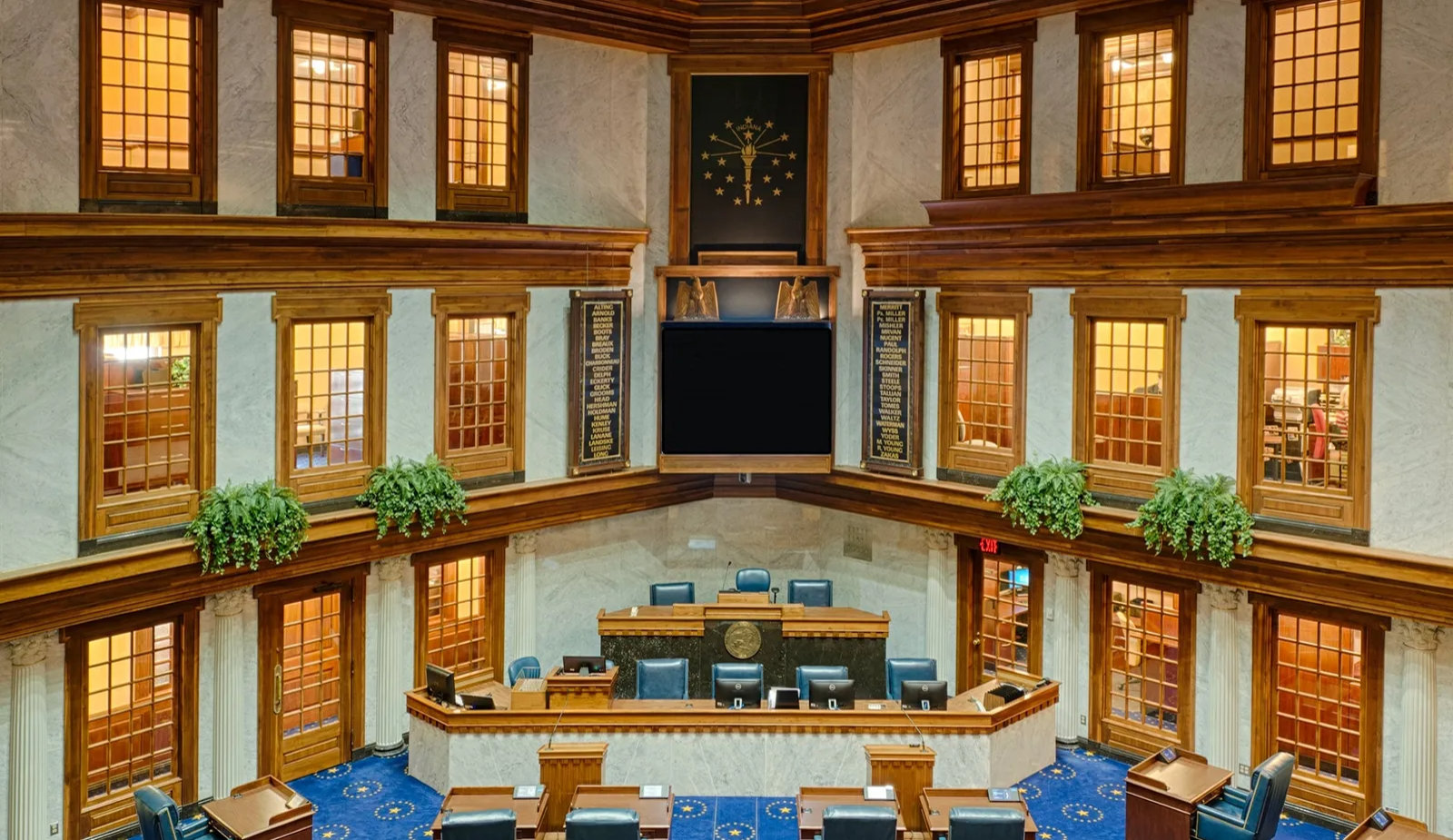
The state flag overlooking the State Building Senate Chamber. The floor carpet design is based on the state flag.

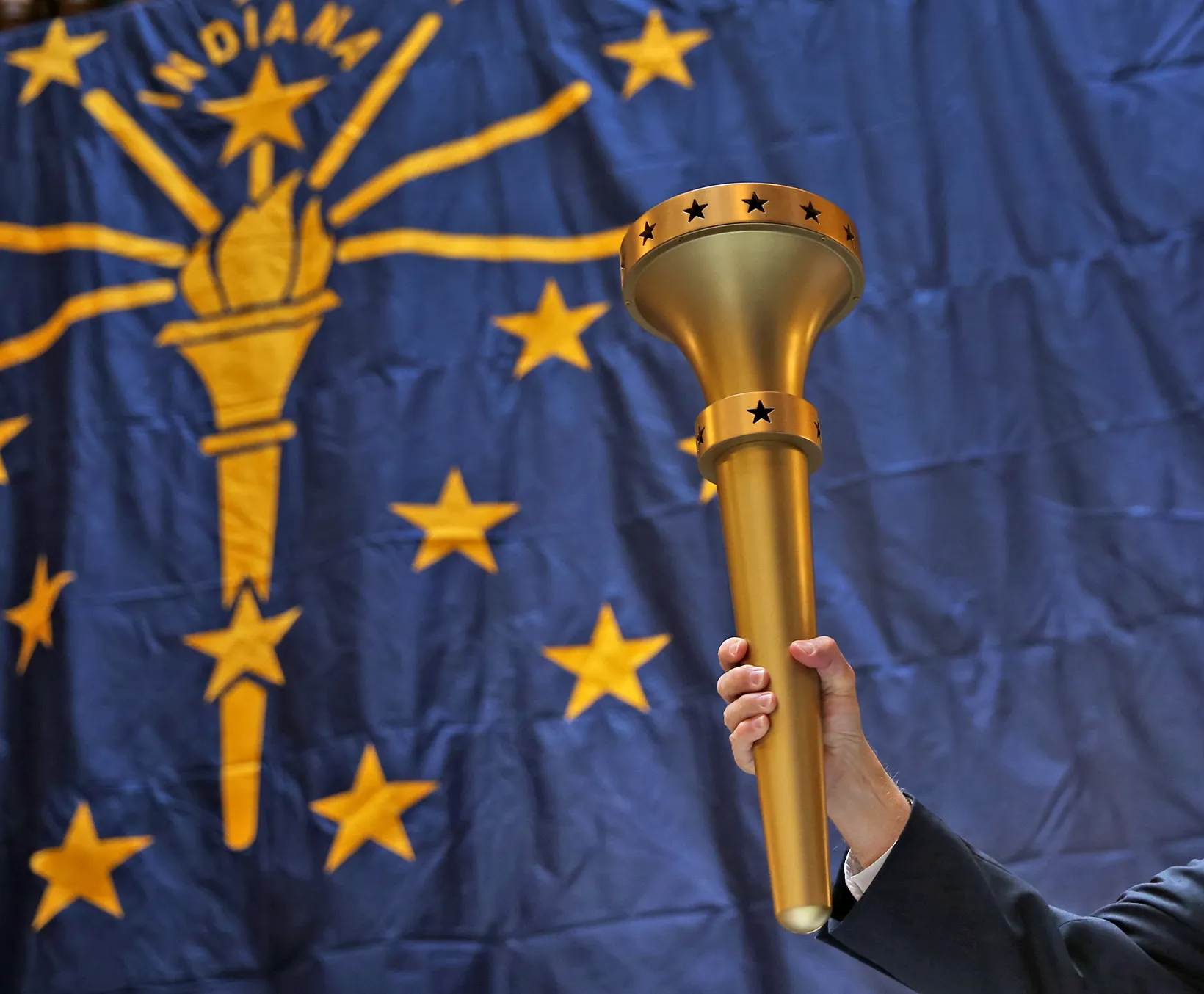
The Bicentennial Torch held up in front of a giant Indiana state flag.

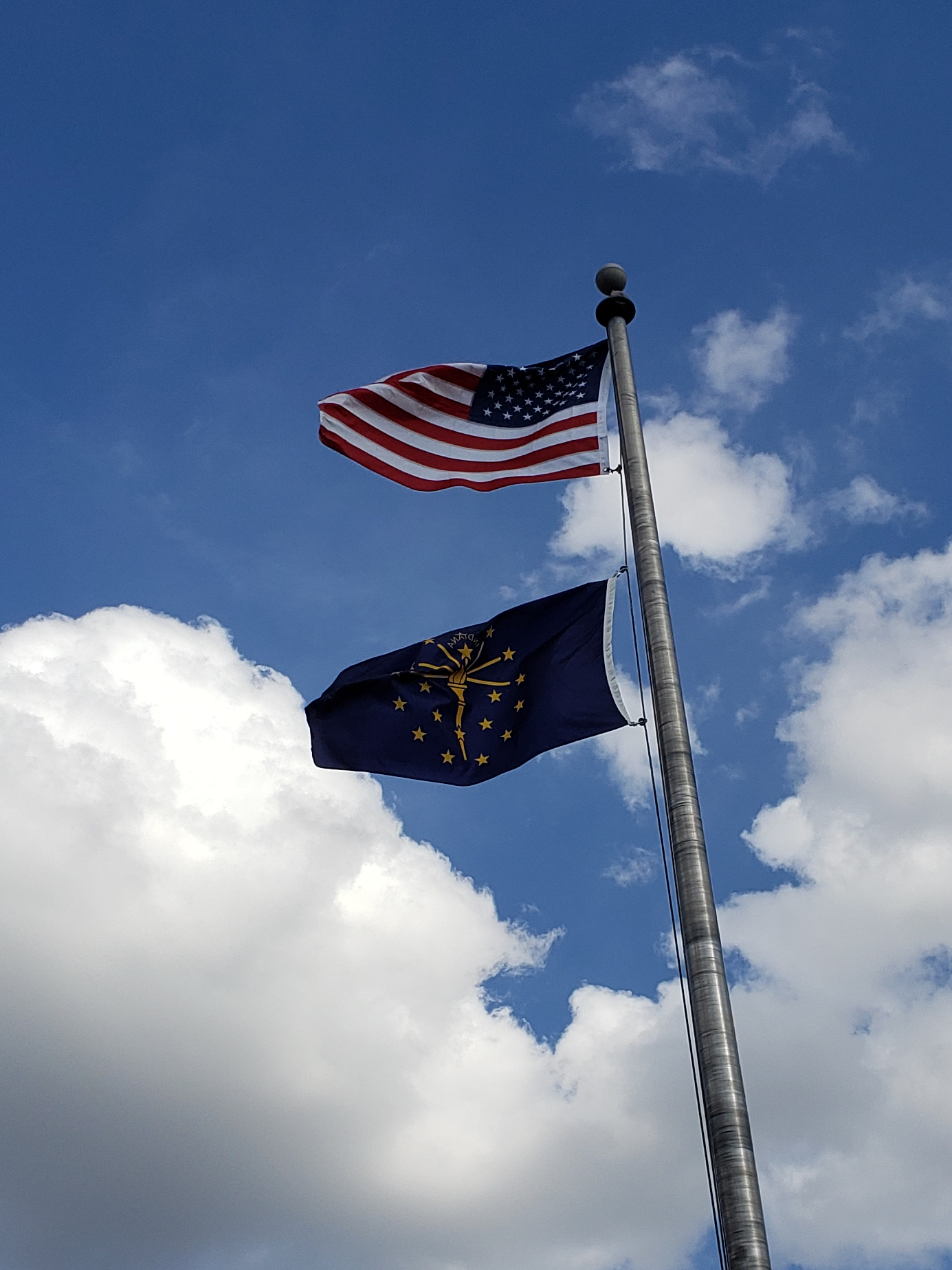
The Indiana flag flying below the American flag.

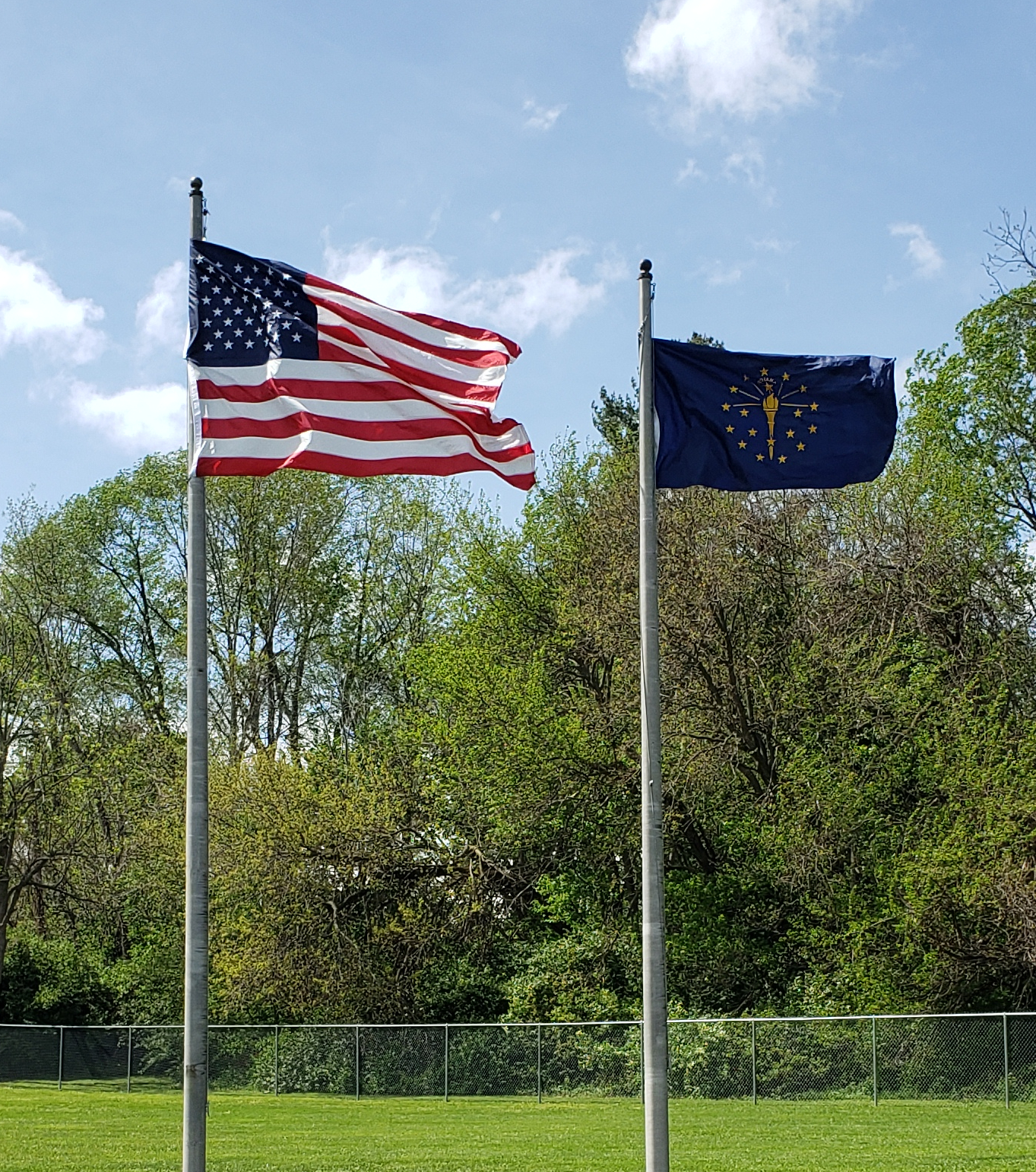
The Indiana flag flying beside the American flag.

== See also ==
- List of Indiana state symbols
  - Seal of Indiana
