= Shirley Willard =

American historian

- Born: September 28, 1936 (age 89)
- Education: Ball State (MA)
- Occupation: Historian
- Years active: 1963–present
- Organization: Fulton County Historical Society

Shirley Willard (born September 28, 1936) is a historian and writer known for her work with the Fulton County Historical Society in Indiana. She has served as the official Fulton County historian since 1981.

== Early life and education ==
Shirley Willard was born as Shirley Ogle on September 28, 1936, to Charlie and Maye Ogle. She lived with her family in Morocco, Indiana, until moving to Rochester at age ten. Her first exposure to history was during her childhood, when she would listen to farmers tell old stories. As a child, Willard attended Woodrow Elementary School and went on to graduate from Rochester High School in 1955. Willard initially went to college to become a teacher, obtaining a bachelor of the arts in English and history from Manchester College in 1959. Willard received her master's degree in English from Ball State University in 1966.

== Career ==
=== Teaching career ===
Willard's career as a historian has its roots in her initial education career. She initially worked as a teacher in Kewanna, North Miami, and Akron schools before becoming a full-time historian. Repeated issues with her eyesight caused her to leave her career as a teacher and pivot towards full-time work as a historian. Her interest in Potawatomi history was first sparked during her time as a teacher, noticing a lack of information in textbooks about the Potawatomi Trail of Death. She would go on to dedicate a significant portion of her career to working with the tribe to preserve Potawatomi history.

=== Fulton County Historical Society ===
Willard was one of the founding members of the Fulton County Historical Society in 1963. She initially served as the secretary before becoming its president in 1971. In 1975, she worked to acquire an annex to the depot museum to display old farm equipment and vehicles. Within a few years, Willard began to receive statewide recognition for her work. In 1979, she was elected to represent Fulton County on the Association of Indiana Museums board of directors. The Indiana Historical Society and Indiana Historical Bureau appointed her as the official Fulton County historian in 1981. As historical society president and Fulton County museum director, Willard oversaw major expansion of Fulton County historical properties. During her tenure, the Fulton County Museum and the living history village of Loyal were built and established in Rochester, Indiana. By 1997, Loyal featured a Norfolk and Western caboose, a log cabin, blacksmith shop, the William Polke house, and a print shop. She also led the fundraising efforts for the new Fulton County Historical Society building in 1986, with it being built and dedicated on June 24, 1989. The new location replaced its former headquarters in Rochester's Civic Center.

Willard retired in 2001 after 30 years of serving as president of the Fulton County Historical Society. She is still active as a writer and historian with the Potawatomi Trail of Death Association.

== Notable contributions ==
=== Round barns ===
Willard has played an active role in preservation and information on round barns across Fulton County. She is listed as the preparer of the National Register of Historic Places nomination form for the Utter-Gerig Round Barn. She is also listed as a reference on the nomination form for the Bert Leedy Round Barn and as a contributor for the book A Round Indiana: Round Barns in the Hoosier State (second edition). Willard spearheaded the move and reconstruction of the Bert Leedy barn in 1990, which reportedly cost $60,000. The restored barn was converted from a barn to a historical building and opened to the public as the Round Barn Museum in 1991. Willard established the National Center of Round Barn Information within the Fulton County Museum as a resource for continued round barn preservation efforts.

=== Potawatomi history ===
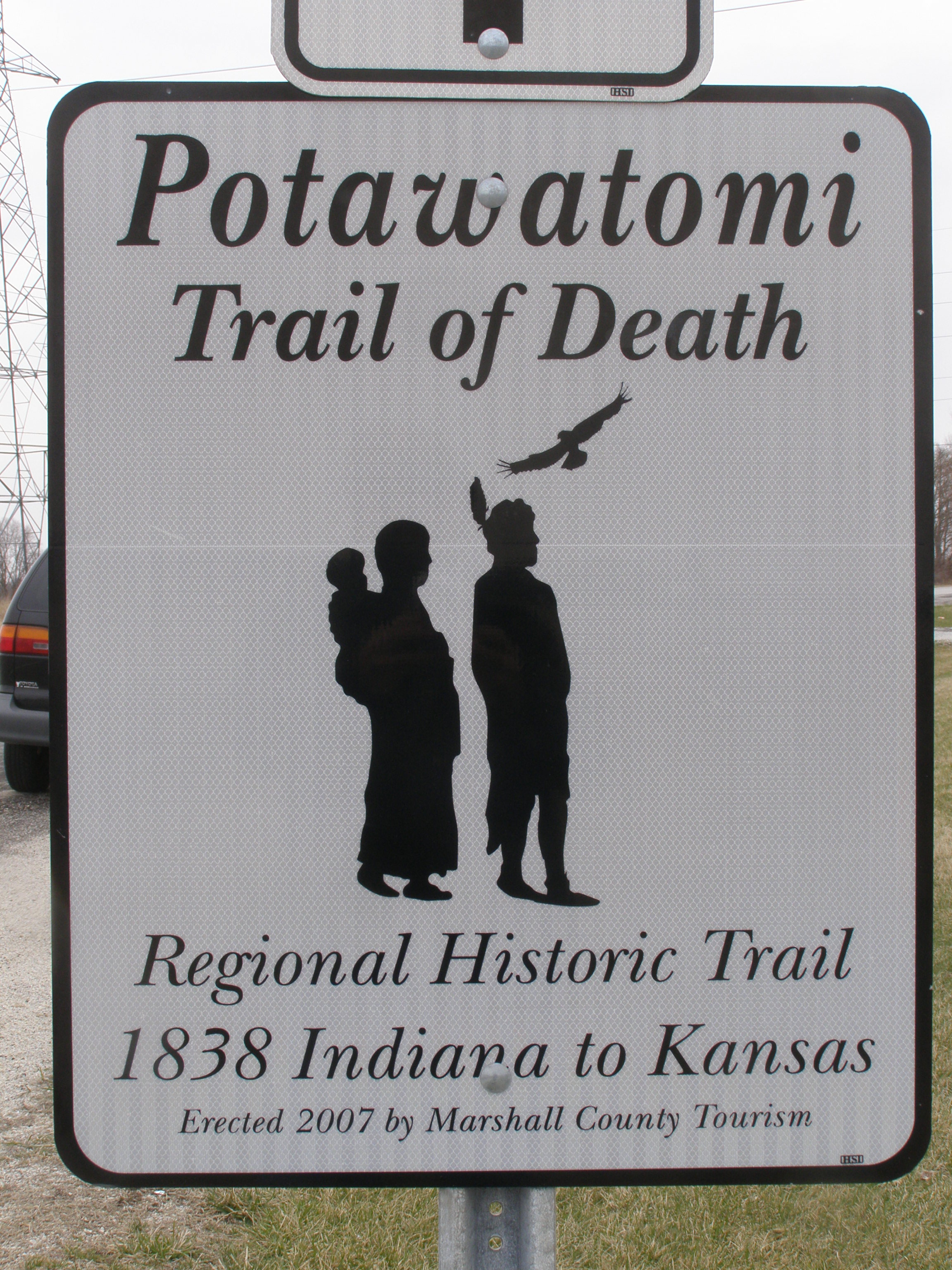
A Trail of Death Regional Historic Trail marker placed in Argos, Indiana

In 1976, Willard founded the Trail of Courage Living History Festival to honor descendants of Potawatomi families affected by Indian Removal on the Trail of Death. The festival is an annual event featuring historical reenactments and activities that include traditional Native craft and music, as well as representation of frontier era Indiana. Every five years since 1988, a commemorative caravan embarks along the route of the Trail of Death after the festival, making stops at historically significant spots and sharing history from the march in 1838.

Willard helped found the Potawatomi Trail of Death Association in 2005 to focus on further recording Potawatomi history. Her work with the Association focuses on raising awareness via community events and educational programs. Willard worked in collaboration with members of the tribe to establish historical markers along the route of the Trail of Death from Indiana to Kansas. A total of eighty-two markers have been placed across Indiana, Illinois, Missouri, and Kansas as a result of the efforts of the commemorative caravan. Willard successfully pushed for recognition of the Trail of Death in these states as a Regional Historic Trail.

== Awards ==
Willard's continuing work in recognizing local history has received numerous awards. Notable awards include two from the Indiana Historical Society. In 1994, she received the Indiana Humanities Achievement Award with Distinction from the Indiana Humanities Council. In 2004, Willard received the Dorothy Riker Award for Innovation in the Field of History. Willard was also awarded the Indiana Historical Society's 2017 Eli Lilly Lifetime Achievement Award. Willard was one of the torchbearers representing Fulton County in the 2016 Indiana Bicentennial Torch Relay. In 2019, Willard was given the Golden Hoosier Award by the Indiana Family and Social Services Administration, acknowledging senior Hoosiers who have made distinguished contributions to their communities.

== Personal life ==
Shirley met her long-time husband Bill Willard in 1964. She credits part of her success as a historian to his support. The historical markers along the trail of death were originally part of their son Alan's Eagle Scout project. Since the placement of the first marker in 1974, many of the subsequent markers have been placed as part of other Eagle Scout projects.

== Bibliography ==
- Fulton County Folks vol. 1 (1974)
- Fulton County Folks vol. 2 (1974)
- Willard, Shirley; Campbell, Susan, eds. (2003). Potawatomi Trail of Death: 1838 Removal from Indiana to Kansas. Fulton County Historical Society.
- Rochester (Images of America) (2009)
- "Potawatomi Trail of Death: Journey Commemorates Removal of American Indian Tribe from Indiana in 1838". The Hoosier Genealogist: Connections. 60 (1): 22–30. 2020.
- Fulton County, Indiana: the Luckiest County in the World (2023)
