= Paul Hadley =

American artist

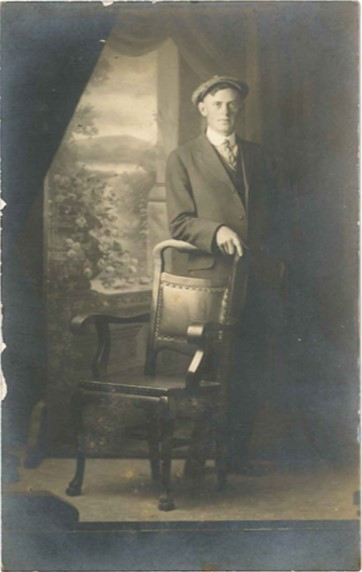
- Paul Hadley in 1905 pictured above.
- Born: August 5, 1880; Indianapolis, Indiana, U.S.
- Died: January 31, 1971 (aged 90); Richmond, Indiana, U.S.
- Burial place: Crown Hill Cemetery and Arboretum, Section 41, Lot 82; 39.82°N 86.1641667°W
- Occupation: Artist
- Notable work: Creator of the current Indiana state flag

Paul Hadley was an American artist, mainly a watercolorist, who is known for his creation of the current flag of Indiana. He lived most of his life in Mooresville, Indiana. A middle school in Mooresville is named after him.

== Early life ==
Paul Hadley was born on August 5, 1880, in Indianapolis, Indiana, to Evan Hadley and Ella Quinn Hadley. He was the youngest of four sons. When Paul was born, he and his family lived in 187 Virginia Avenue, Indianapolis. Hadley was a student at Indianapolis High School. He dropped out after his freshman year to attend the Manual Training High School, in order to study art under Otto Stark. After graduating, Hadley furthered his art studies at the Pennsylvania Museum and School of Industrial Art in Philadelphia in 1900 for two years, and later at the Pennsylvania Academy of the Fine Arts in the same city in 1903.

== Career ==
Paul Hadley created stained glass pieces and did interior design for churches and wealthy homes. In 1922, Hadley became a facility member at the Herron School of Art and Design in Indianapolis. For the first ten years of working at Herron School of Art, Hadley taught classes in watercolor and interior design. He later served as Assistant Curator at the school. In May 1933, Hadley was fired due to the school struggling during the Great Depression. Shortly after creating the state flag, he began a new career as a muralist.

== Artwork ==
Hadley created several watercolor pieces. His watercolors were displayed and sold at the annual Hoosier Salon, the Indiana Artists Club, and the Indiana State Fair art exhibitions. Hadley typically won several awards for his watercolors from each event. In 1921, Hadley rented a fifth floor studio in the Union Trust Building, now demolished, at 120 East Market Street in Indianapolis. During the autumn of 1921, Hadley spent three months painting in Italy, Switzerland, France, Belgium, and England. Upon returning to the United States, some of his paintings were exhibited at the Indianapolis Women's Department Club. By the end of the decade, Hadley had given up his art studio, but he continued to paint, mainly in his home in Mooresville. His watercolors are now on display at the Indiana State Museum, Emmerich Manual High School, and the Indianapolis Museum of Art.

== Creation of the flag ==
To commemorate the state's 1916 centennial anniversary, the Indiana General Assembly issued a resolution to adopt a new state flag. At the request of the General Assembly, a contest was sponsored by the Indiana Society of the Daughters of the American Revolution to design a flag to serve as the official state banner. As an incentive to increase the number of submissions, the contest offered the winner a $100 cash prize. More than 200 submissions were received, including several from Hadley. An entry created by Hadley was ultimately chosen as the winner of the contest and the cash prize.

Hadley made several copies of his original flag design. When he would create a flag, he would cut out the symbols and glue them onto the flag. The material he used for the symbols had a shiny gold appearance. Prior to Hadley's flag, Irwin B. Arnold and William C. Langdon had both created proposal flags that had very similar design elements. These flags were likely inspirations for Paul Hadley's flag design.

On May 31, 1917, Hadley's flag was chosen as the state's official banner. The General Assembly made only one change to Hadley's original design: they added the word Indiana, in a crescent shape, over the top of the large star. The state banner was later designated as the state flag in a statute passed in 1955 that also standardized the dimensions of the flag.

To honor Hadley for the creation of the state flag, the new junior high school in Mooresville was renamed to Paul Hadley Middle School in July 1965. Hadley's hometown of Mooresville adopted "Home of the State Flag" as its official motto in November 1965.

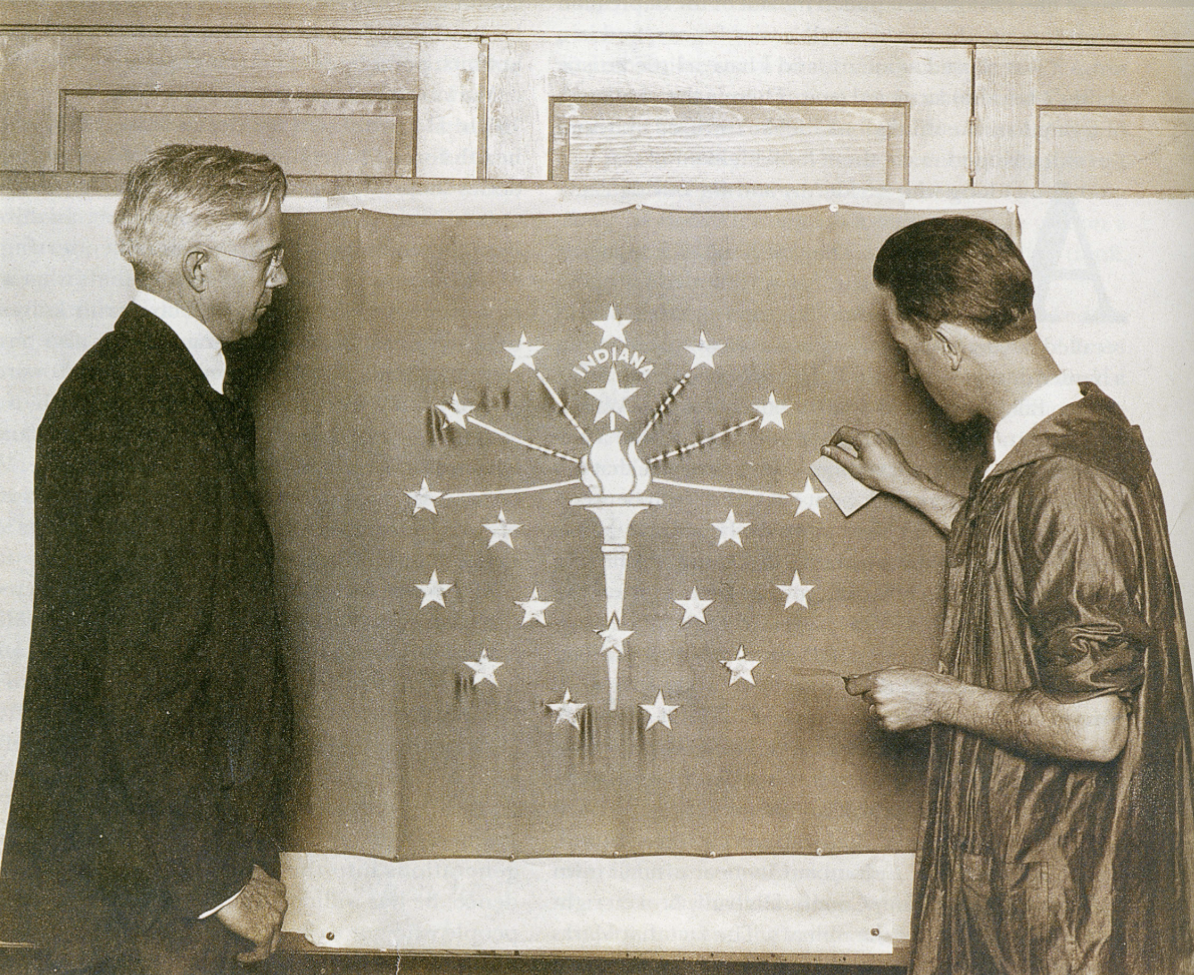
Paul Hadley (left) watches as Ralph Priest, a student at Herron School of Art, applies gold leaf to his flag, 1917.

Hadley's initial flag design with the state name omitted.

The current flag of Indiana.

== Personal life ==
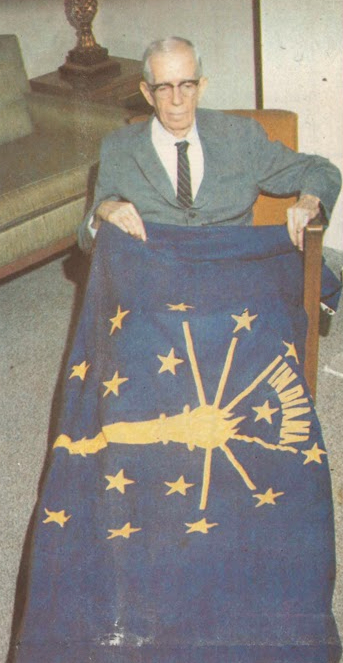
Paul Hadley with his creation, February 1969.

Hadley's family first moved to Mooresville, Indiana, in late 1902. Paul and his parents built a small two-story house on West South Street. The house was later moved to 320 Lockerbie Street where it still stands. Paul's father, Dr. Evan Hadley, died in May 1903. Paul permanently moved to Mooresville in 1912 to help care for his mother and for his older brother, Evan, who was developmentally disabled. After Paul's mother died in 1930, Paul and Evan sold the house in 1950. They moved into a smaller house at 24 East Washington Street until Evan died in 1954. The house was soon demolished after Paul moved out the same year. Hadley moved into a small apartment at 115 North East Street in Plainfield, Indiana. Because Hadley never learned how to drive, he moved to Plainfield to be close to a regular bus line to Indianapolis. Six years later, Hadley moved to Cincinnati, Ohio, to be closer to relatives. In June 1969, Hadley finally moved into the Reid Memorial Nursing Home in Richmond, Indiana, to be closer to his other family.

Haldey was a Quaker for all of his life, and he was very humble. His close friends described him as a tall and erect man with white hair. He was known to be a quiet, modest, and dignified person. His friends enjoyed him for his occasional and unexpected quick humor. Beyond his friends, he was known for collecting oddly shaped and ornately decorated antique bottles. Hadley loved nature. He enjoyed taking long walks in the country, which would serve as inspiration for his watercolors. Hadley was a member of the Mooresville nature club and the Mooresville Friends Church.

Paul Hadley died on January 31, 1971, at the age of 90 in Richmond, Indiana. A few days later, the Indiana Senate passed a resolution acknowledging his passing. The resolution referred to Hadley as "the dean of Hoosier watercolor artists".

== Gallery ==
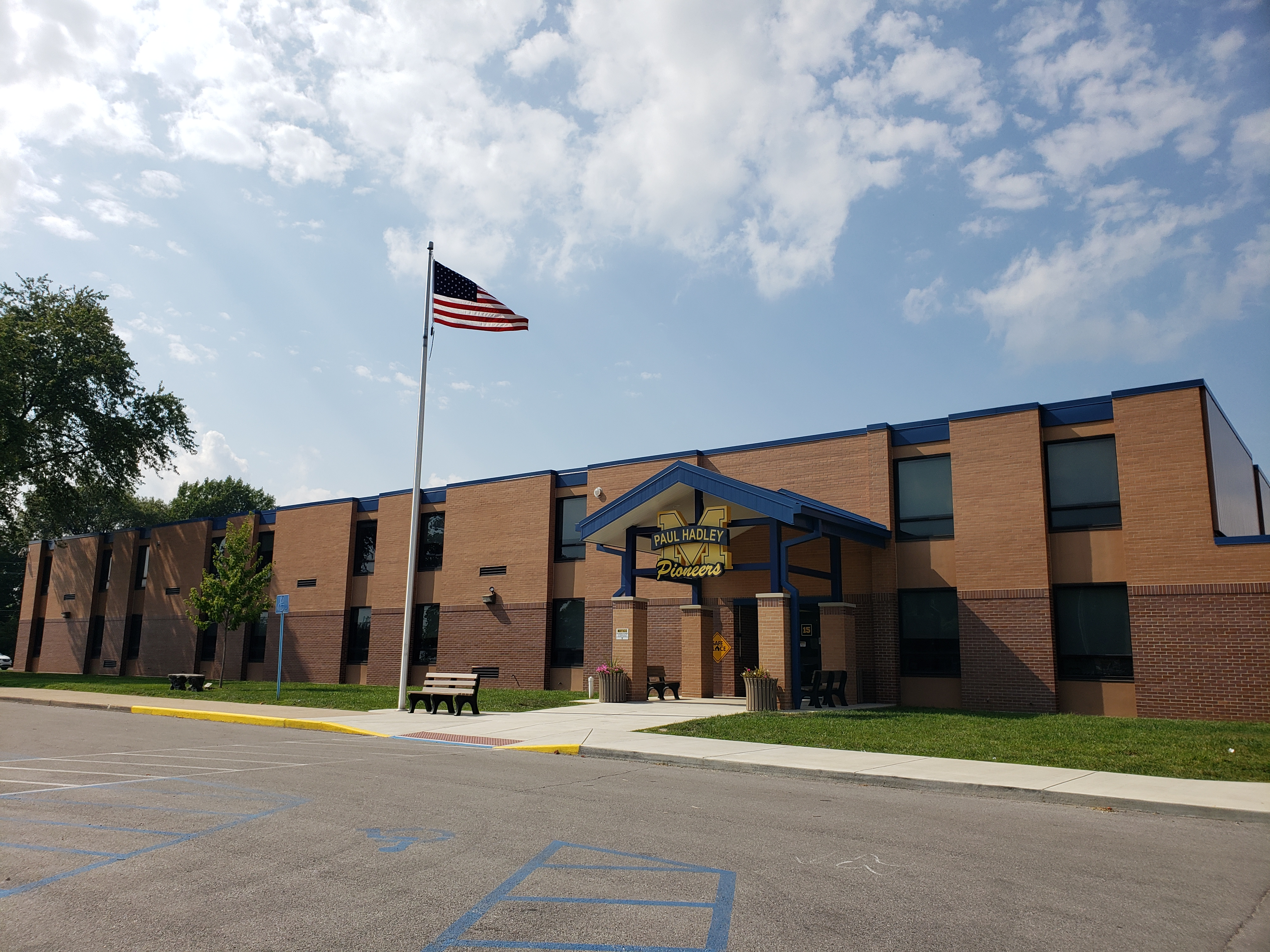
Paul Hadley Middle School in Mooresville, Indiana, is named in honor of Hadley.

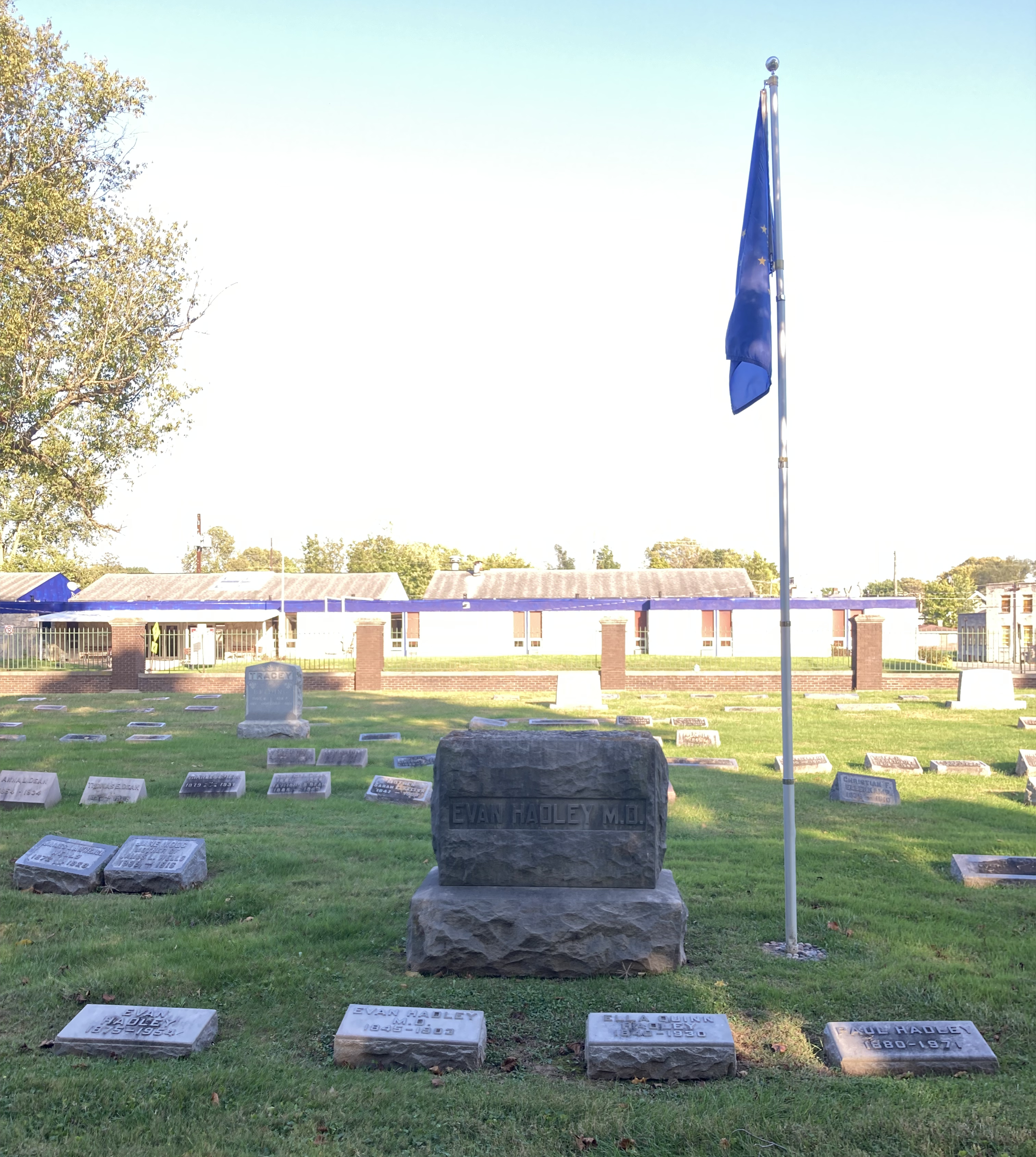
Grave site of Hadley in Crown Hill Cemetery, Indianapolis. A state flag was erected above Hadley's tombstone.

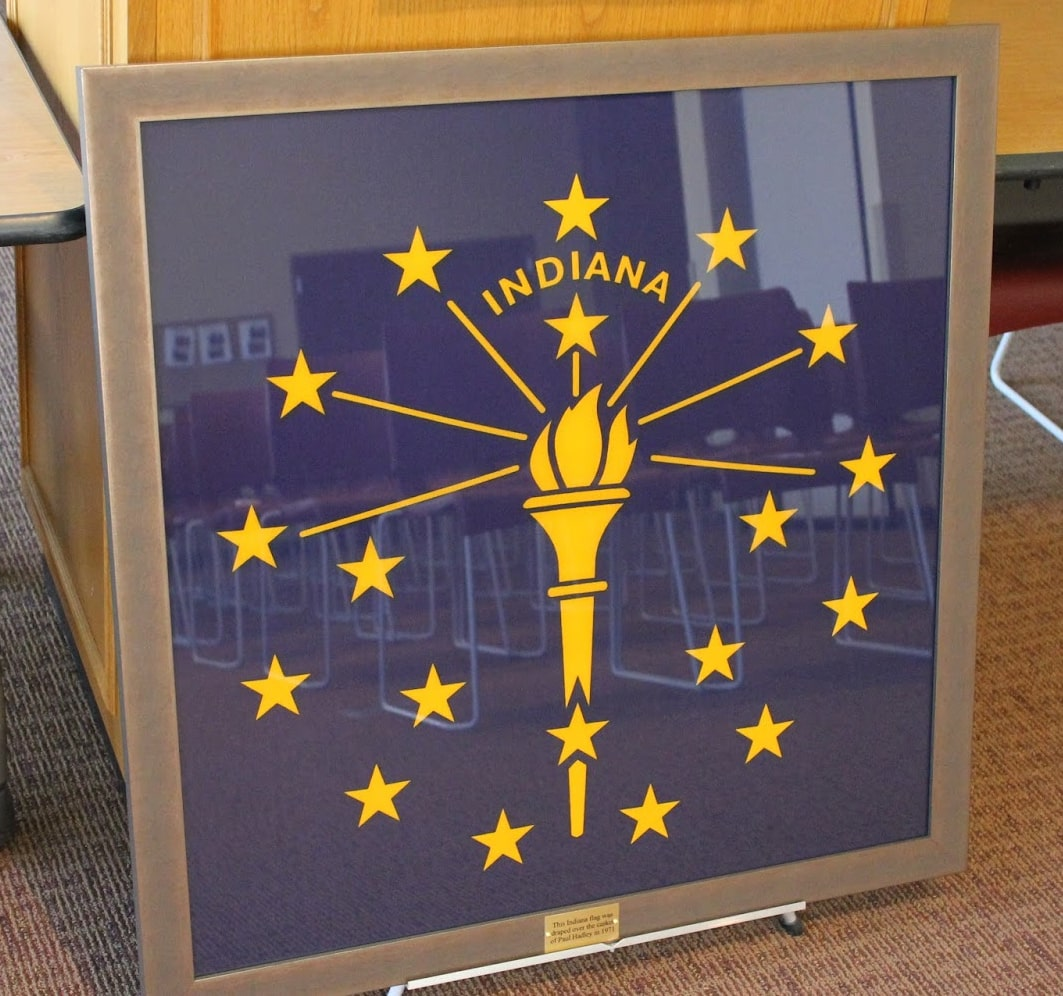
The state flag that was draped over Hadley's coffin during his funeral.

== See also ==
- List of Indiana state symbols
- Eliza "Lizzie" Callis
