= Eliza "Lizzie" Callis =

American librarian

Eliza Scott
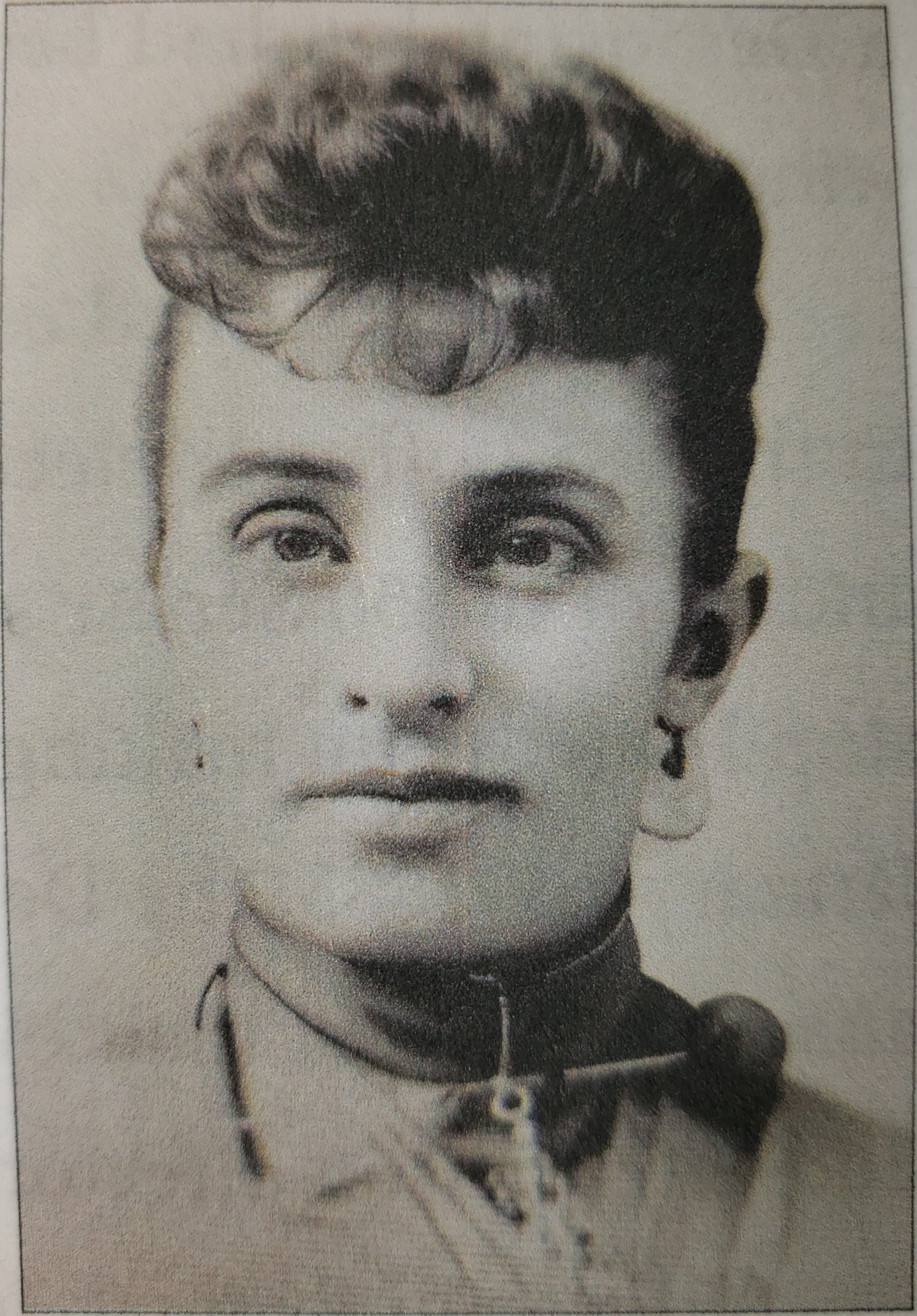
- Born: Eliza Callis; October 19, 1856; Martinsville, Indiana, U.S.
- Died: September 21, 1923 (aged 66)
- Burial place: Hilldale Cemetery, Martinsville
- Other names: Lizzie
- Occupation: Indiana State Librarian
- Notable work: Creator of the first official Indiana state flag

Eliza "Lizzie" O. Scott (née Callis, October 19, 1856 – September 21, 1923) was an American librarian for the Indiana State Library in Indianapolis. She served three 2-year terms. During her time as the State Librarian, she was asked to make a state flag for Indiana, which lacked a flag at the time.

== Early life ==
Eliza "Lizzie" Callis, one of six daughters, was born on October 19, 1856, in Martinsville, Indiana to Edwin Willard Callis and Ellen Green (Orner) Callis, after her parents had recently moved to Martinsville.

== Newspaper career ==
Edwin Callis, a printer and bookmaker, purchased the Morgan County Gazette in May 1855. At that time, the newspaper was considered a Republican publication, but Edwin had switched his political party allegiance, renaming the newspaper to the Martinsville Democrat, with a new motto that read "Independent on all Subjects—Neutral on None." Eliza and her sister, Anna, showed early interest in the newspaper, and had taken control of the paper when Eliza had turned 18 years old.

== State Library ==
On January 16, 1883, the elected Democrats of Indiana planned a caucus meeting to select possible candidates for the role of State Librarian for the Indiana State Library, which later become an election for the position. Although there was an initial dozen people who sought interest in the role, as the caucus meeting was soon to be held, the candidates had narrowed down to two women in what would become a two-woman race between Eliza Callis and Mrs. T. J. Foster from Fort Wayne, Indiana. Mrs. Foster was backed by her husband, Senator Thomas J. Foster, who had a career in politics and business.

After the caucus meeting, an election was set up for the public to vote for a candidate. In the first ballot, Mrs. Foster gained an early lead of 18 votes to Callis's 17 votes. After the second ballot, Callis surged past Foster by gaining 39 more votes. Come the third ballot, Callis ultimately won the election with an additional 38 votes, a majority of the votes. Callis became the newest State Librarian on April 1, 1883. Her salary was an annual sum of $1,200.

== Creation of the flag ==
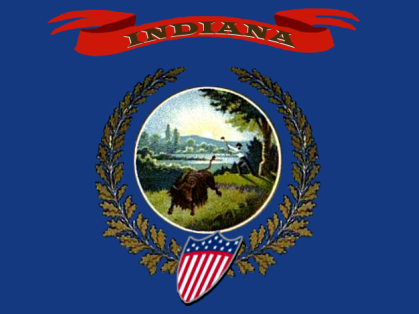
The flag designed by Eliza Callis, 1885. Became the first official state flag of Indiana. Recognized in the "Legislative and State Manual of Indiana" (1899).

On February 21, 1885, each state was asked to dedicate a state flag for the Washington Monument. At the time, Indiana lacked a state flag, and so, as requested by the Indiana Government, the State Librarian was directed to create a state flag.

Concurrent Resolution No, 6, which had ordered the creation of the flag, read as follows:

WHEREAS, it appears that the State of Indiana is now without a State flag, banner or ensign, and

WHEREAS, There has been a request made by the Committee on Arrangements on the dedication of the Washington Monument, on 21st of February, 1885, of the State Librarian to furnish one, therefore

Resolved by the House of Representatives, the Senate concurring. That the State Librarian be, and is hereby authorized to purchase a suitable, flag or ensign, and have the Coat of Arms of the State appropriately inscribed thereon.

While it is not known how much money Eliza Callis spent on producing the flag, it is known that the flag was assembled in less than 17 days. No record exists detailing whether Callis solely designed the flag, if she had help from her staff, or if she had employed a non-government figure to produce the flag.

The flag consists of the seal of Indiana in the center, an oak leaf wreath, a star-spangled shield with 13 stars and stripes, and a red ribbon above the seal with the word "Indiana" spelled out on it, all of which is mounted on a blue silk background. Callis had utilized a gold fringe that covered three sides of the flag as a finishing touch.

On February 19, 1886, Callis had sent a note with the flag to Senate President Pro Tem M. D. Manson stating that the flag "is not yet completed, as the center painting is to be removed and the center filled in with embroidery, as shown by the shield, which change will be made as soon as the flag is returned from the Washington Monument Association."

The flag was said to have been returned to Indiana, but its current location and condition has not been known since its return.

== Personal life ==
Eliza Callis married Lieutenant Colonel Jefferson Kingsley Scott in December 1887. Following her retirement from being a librarian, the couple settled in Martinsville in 1899. The couple lived on West Washington Street for the remaining duration of their lives. Jefferson Scott, who was 29 years older than Eliza, died on April 5, 1903. Eliza died on September 21, 1923, and was buried at Hilldale Cemetery in Martinsville next to her husband.

== See also ==
- List of Indiana state symbols
- Paul Hadley
