= Indiana Bicentennial Torch Relay =

Indiana Bicentennial Torch Relay was an Olympic-style torch relay to mark the 200th anniversary of the state of Indiana. The relay spanned 3,200 miles over all 92 counties in the state. It started on September 9, 2016, in Corydon, Indiana, the state's first capital, and ended October 15, 2016 at the Statehouse Grounds in Indianapolis. The relay path included 17 state parks, 260 cities, 9 rivers and lakes, and 22 college campuses.

== Symbols ==
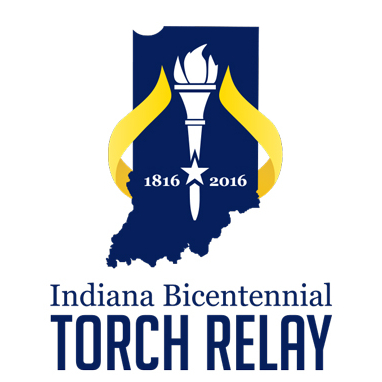
Official logo for the event.

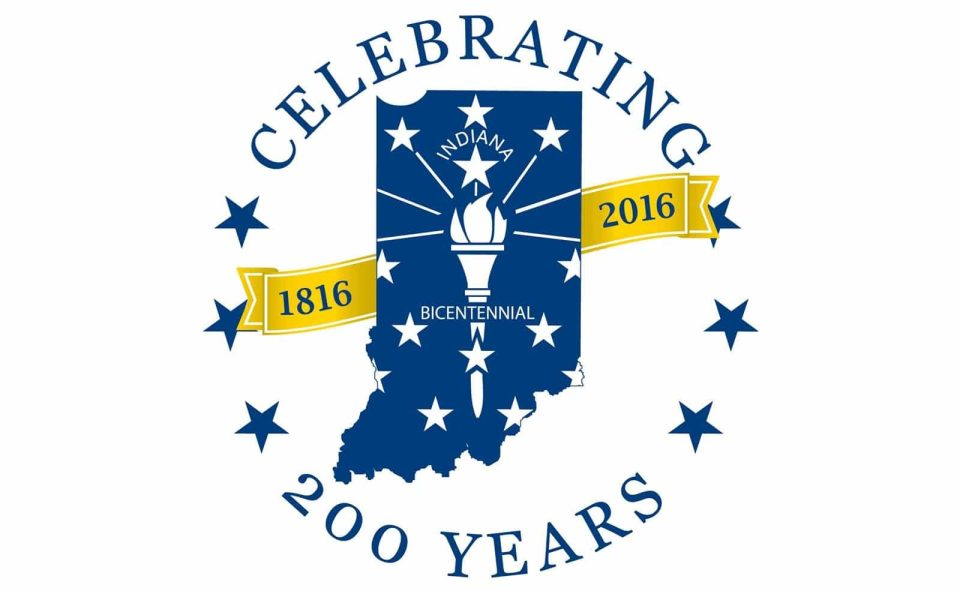
Official event flag given to all communities and all counties in Indiana.

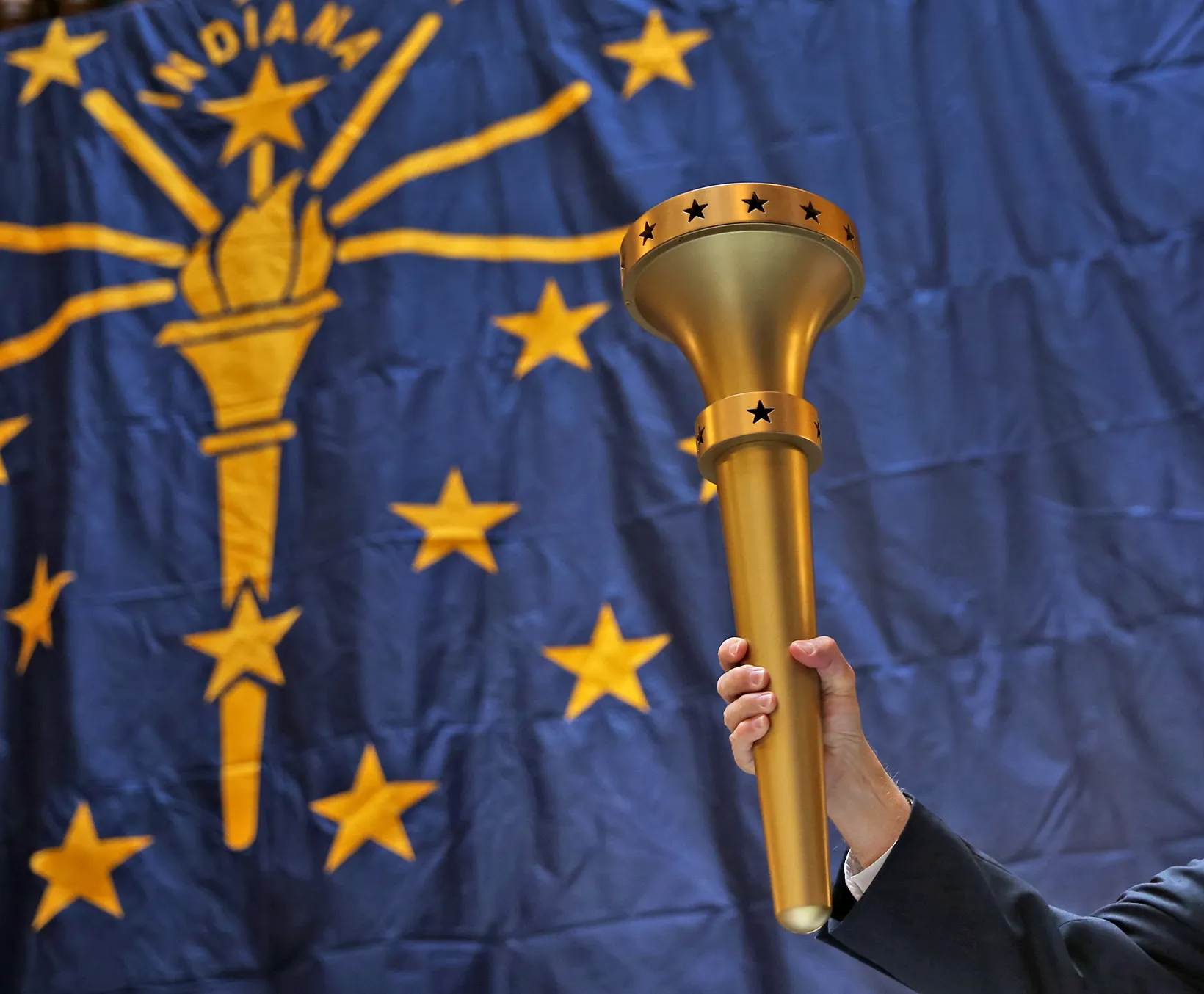
The Bicentennial Torch held up in front of a large Indiana state flag.

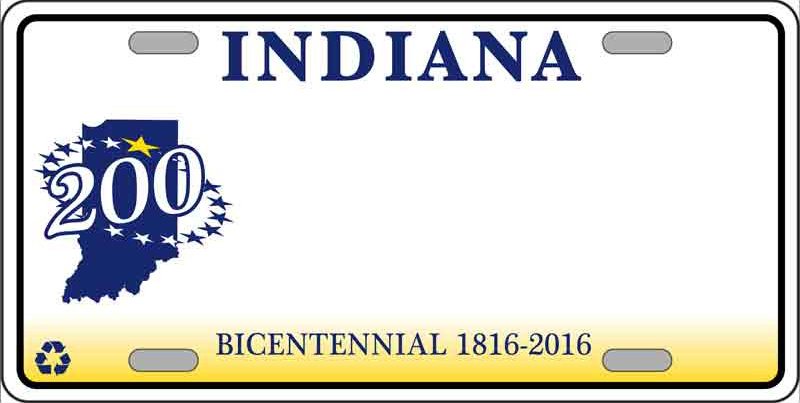
License plate created to spread awareness for the event.

=== The Bicentennial Torch ===
The torch for the relay was designed and built by a group of faculty, staff, and students at Purdue University. The torch design is inspired by the flag of Indiana and contains two circles of stars. The rim of the torch contains 13 stars to represent the Thirteen Colonies. The ring on the handle of the torch contains a circle of 5 stars to represent the states that gained statehood prior to Indiana. At the top of the torch is a large star where the flame is to be lit. This large star represents Indiana's statehood as the 19th state. Several models of the torch were produced for the event. Smaller toy versions of the torch, with a battery powered light up flame, were produced and sold.

After the event, the torches were given to various organizations to be put on display for the public to see for a limited time in 2017.

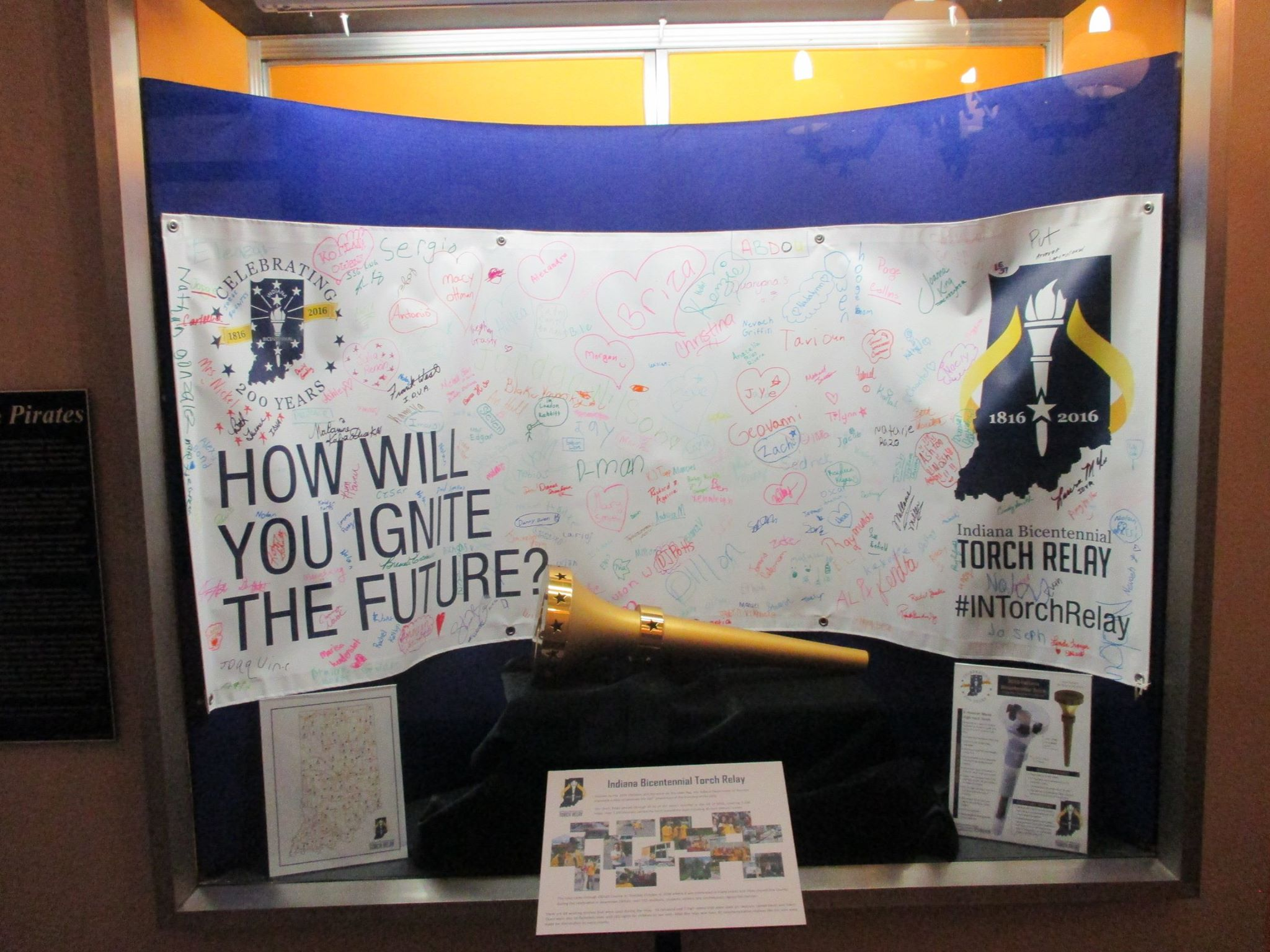
Torch on display at Elkhart County Historical Museum from March 30, 2017, to December 31, 2017.

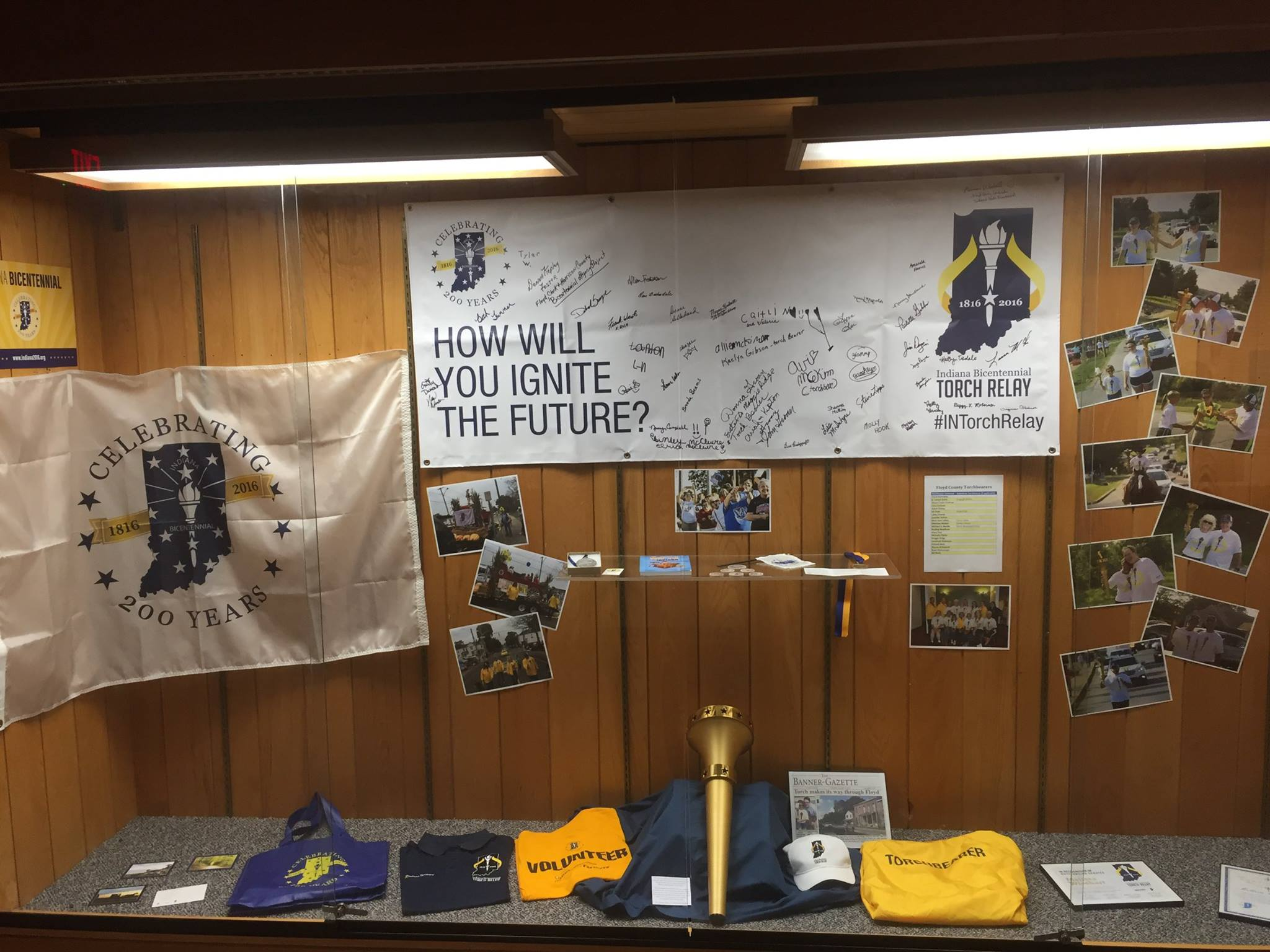
Torch on display at New Albany Floyd County Public Library from October 11, 2017, to October 31, 2017.

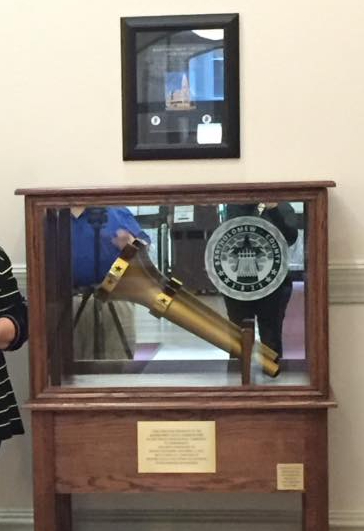
Torch on display at Bartholomew County, April 22, 2017.

== Torchbearers ==
Over 2,000 torchbearers were selected to represent their counties in the torch relay.

- Mitch Daniels, president of Purdue University and the former governor of Indiana
- Bob and Ellie Haan, co-founders of Haan Mansion Museum of Indiana Art
- John I. Jenkins, president of University of Notre Dame
- Tuck Langland, sculptor
- Pamela Mow, president of the Indiana Gold Star Mothers
- Betty Nelson, dean of students emerita at Purdue University
- David Heighway, county historian of Hamilton County
- Bob Shannon, a host at WSCH radio station
- Sharon Versyp, basketball player and head coach of Purdue University women's basketball team
- David Wolf (astronaut)
- Shirley Willard, county historian of Fulton County

== Official Outfits ==
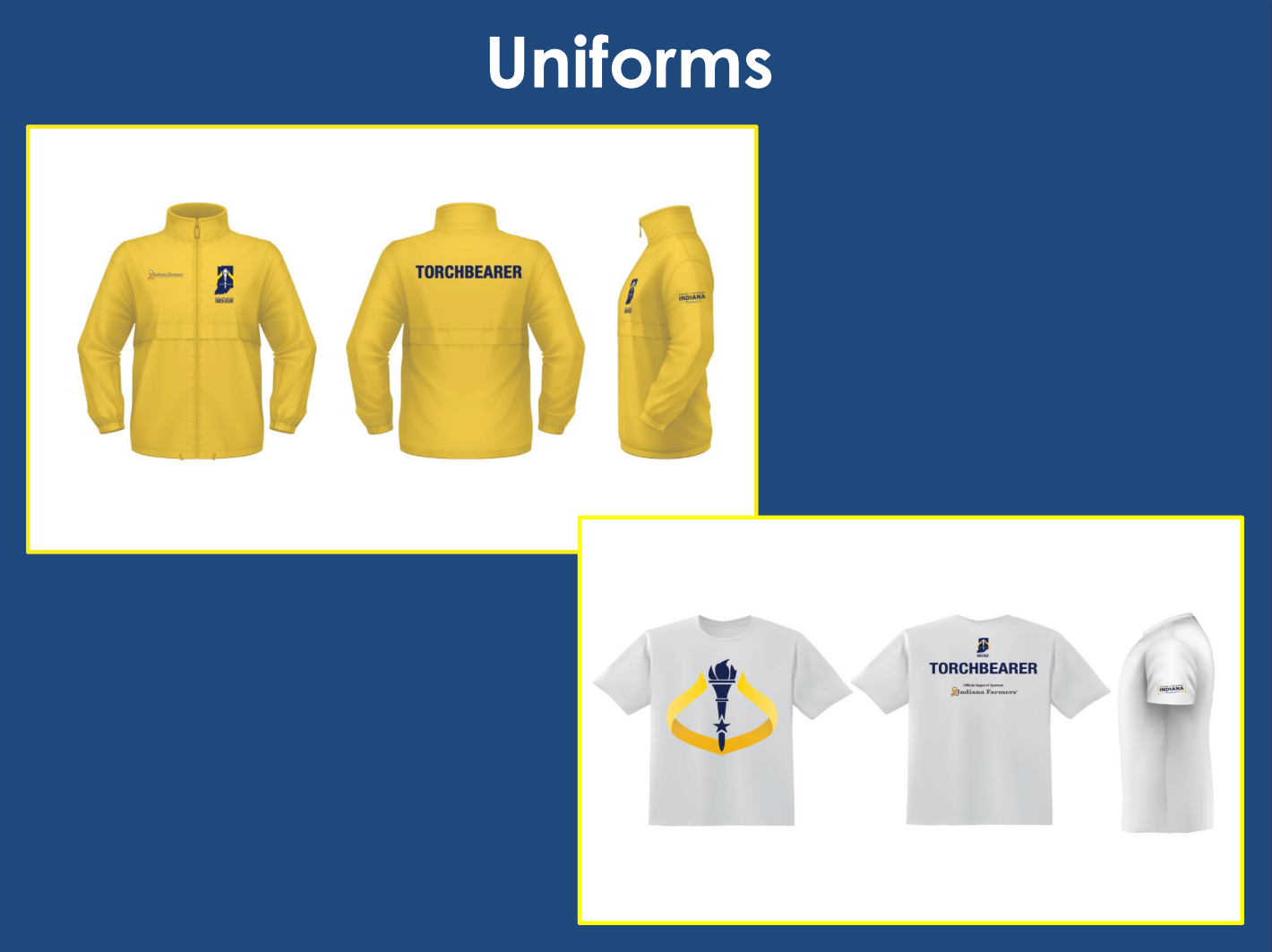
Prototype illustrations of the uniforms presented by the Indiana government.

Two pieces of clothing, a shirt and a jacket, were given to and worn by the torchbearers for the event. The shirt is a white T-shirt with a simplified logo on the front and the word "torchbearer" on the back with a sponsor below it. The jacket is a yellow zip up jacket with a small print of the logo on the upper left hand side and a sponsor on the right hand side. The back reads "torchbearer" in large text.

The rules for the uniforms, set by the Indiana government, goes as follows:

• You are representing the State of Indiana
- No embellishments or alterations of your uniform of any kind.
- Example - Removing sleeves, adding rhinestones or sequins.

• Pants/Bottoms – at your discretion
- What ever is most comfortable for your leg of the torch relay – running, walking, riding – and mode of transportation

• Weather Conditions
- Be Prepared for changing weather conditions.
- If hot – jackets are not required.
- If cold – LS shirts under t-shirts are acceptable.

• Size Exchange
- Cannot be guaranteed if you were provided the size you requested.
- Coordinate exchanges with your County Coordinator.
