= Index of Massachusetts-related articles =

The location of the Commonwealth of Massachusetts in the United States of America

The following is an alphabetical list of articles related to the United States Commonwealth of Massachusetts.

== 0–9 ==
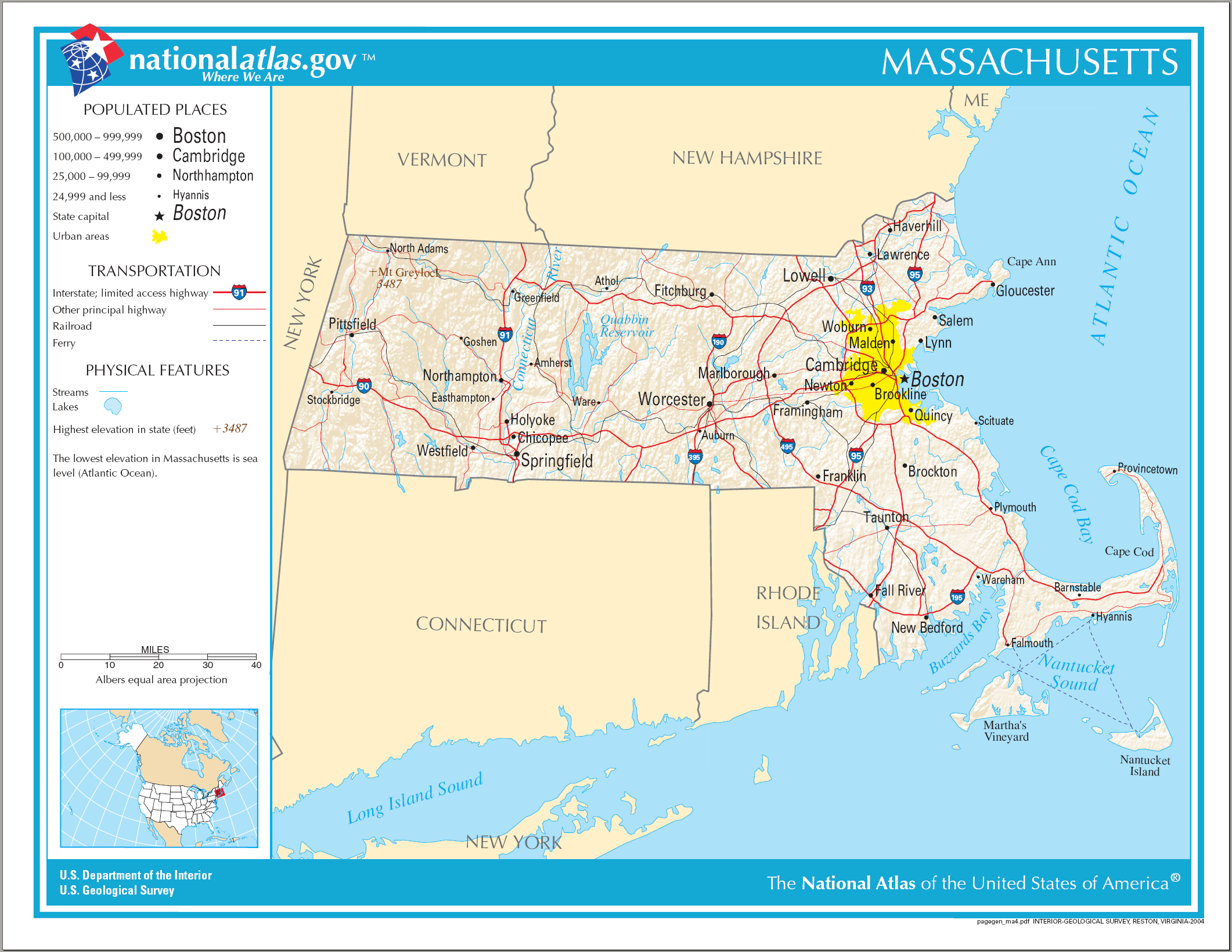
An enlargeable map of the Commonwealth of Massachusetts

- .ma.us – Internet second-level domain for the Commonwealth of Massachusetts
- 6th State to ratify the Constitution of the United States of America

== A ==
- Adjacent states:
  - State of Connecticut
  - State of New Hampshire
  - State of New York
  - State of Rhode Island and Providence Plantations
  - State of Vermont
- Agriculture in Massachusetts
- Airports in Massachusetts
- Amusement parks in Massachusetts
- Aquaria in Massachusetts
  - commons:Category:Aquaria in Massachusetts
- Arboreta in Massachusetts
  - commons:Category:Arboreta in Massachusetts
- Archaeology of Massachusetts
  - Category:Archaeological sites in Massachusetts
    - commons:Category:Archaeological sites in Massachusetts
- Architecture of Massachusetts
- Area codes in Massachusetts
- Art museums and galleries in Massachusetts
  - commons:Category:Art museums and galleries in Massachusetts
- Astronomical observatories in Massachusetts
  - commons:Category:Astronomical observatories in Massachusetts
- Attorney General of the Commonwealth of Massachusetts

== B ==
- Beaches of Massachusetts
  - commons:Category:Beaches of Massachusetts
- Boston, Massachusetts, capital of the Colony of Massachusetts Bay 1630–1686, capital of the Dominion of New-England in America 1686–1689, capital of the Colony of Massachusetts Bay 1689–1691, capital of the Province of Massachusetts Bay 1691–1776, capital of the State of Massachusetts Bay 1776–1780, capital of the Commonwealth of Massachusetts since 1780
- Boston-Cambridge-Quincy, MA-NH Metropolitan Statistical Area
- Boston-Worcester-Manchester, MA-RI-NH Combined Statistical Area
- Botanical gardens in Massachusetts
  - commons:Category:Botanical gardens in Massachusetts
- Buildings and structures in Massachusetts
  - commons:Category:Buildings and structures in Massachusetts

== C ==
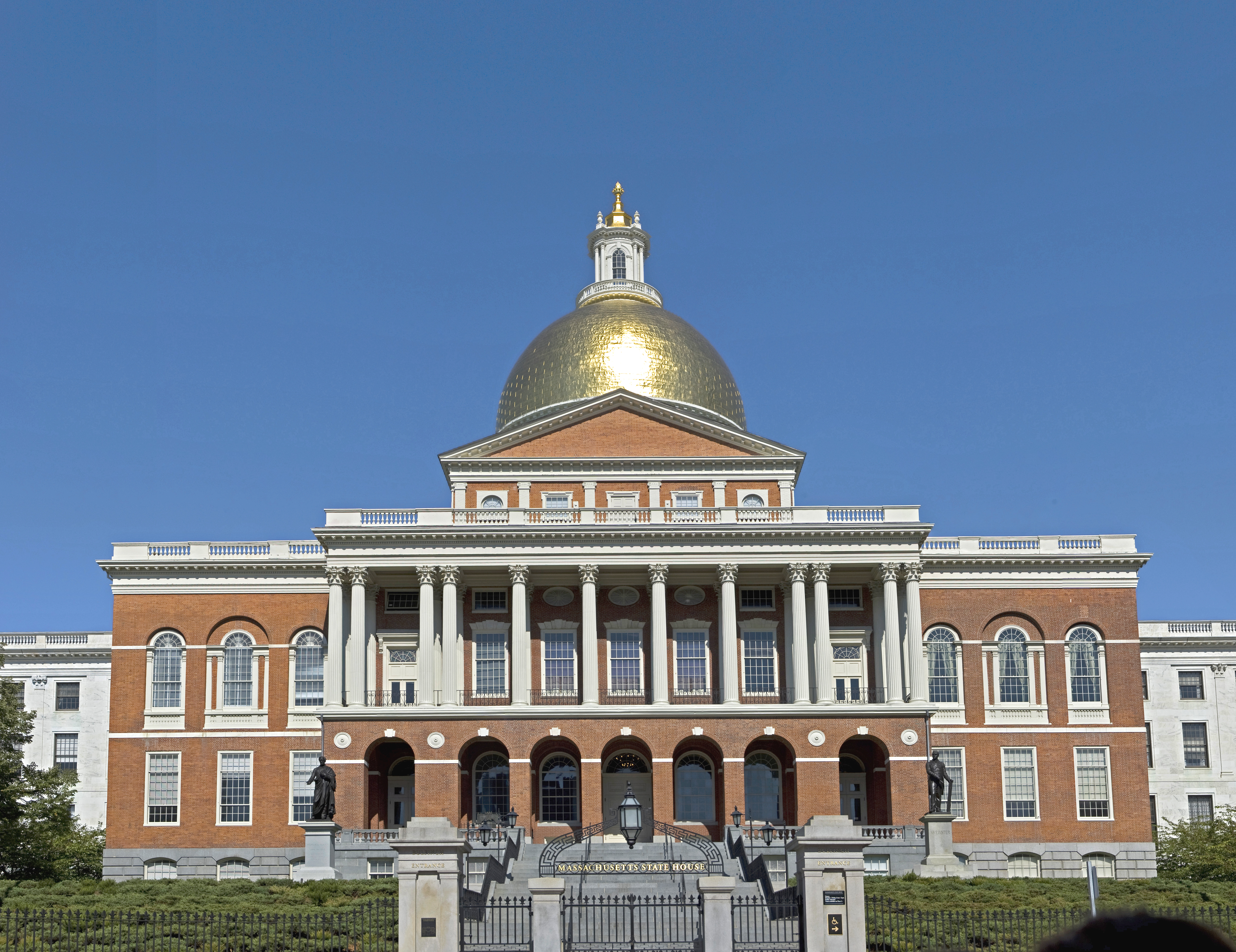
The Commonwealth of Massachusetts State House in Boston

- Capital of the Commonwealth of Massachusetts
- Capitol of the Commonwealth of Massachusetts
  - commons:Category:Massachusetts State Capitol
- Caves of Massachusetts
  - commons:Category:Caves of Massachusetts
- Census statistical areas of Massachusetts
- Cities in Massachusetts
  - commons:Category:Cities in Massachusetts
- Climate of Massachusetts
- Climate change in Massachusetts
- Colleges and universities in Massachusetts
  - commons:Category:Universities and colleges in Massachusetts
- Colony of Massachusetts Bay, 1628–1686 and 1689–1692
- Commonwealth of Massachusetts website
  - Constitution of the Commonwealth of Massachusetts
  - Government of the Commonwealth of Massachusetts
    - Category:Government of Massachusetts
      - commons:Category:Government of Massachusetts
  - Executive branch of the government of the Commonwealth of Massachusetts
    - Governor of the Commonwealth of Massachusetts
  - Legislative branch of the government of the Commonwealth of Massachusetts
    - General Court of the Commonwealth of Massachusetts
      - Senate of the Commonwealth of Massachusetts
      - House of Representatives of the Commonwealth of Massachusetts
  - Judicial branch of the government of the Commonwealth of Massachusetts
    - Supreme Court of the Commonwealth of Massachusetts
- Communications in Massachusetts
  - commons:Category:Communications in Massachusetts
- Companies in Massachusetts

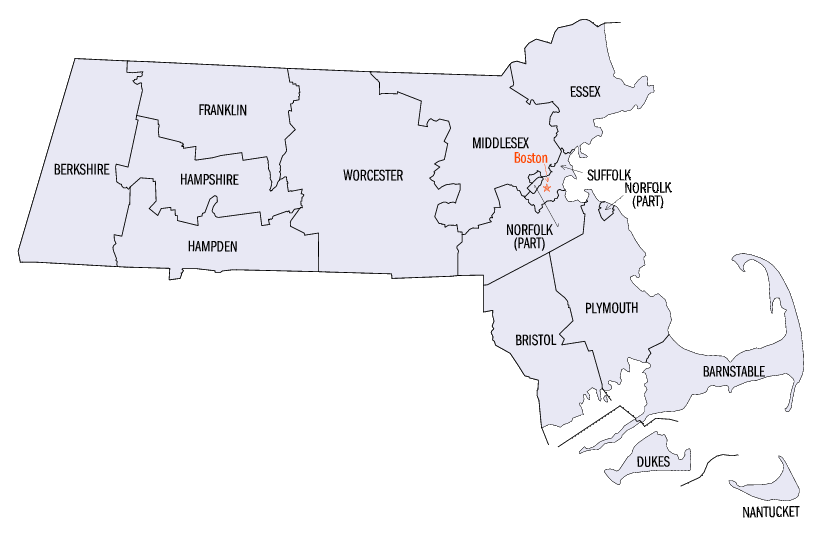
An enlargeable map of the 14 counties of the Commonwealth of Massachusetts

- Congressional districts of Massachusetts
- Constitution of the Commonwealth of Massachusetts
- Convention centers in Massachusetts
  - commons:Category:Convention centers in Massachusetts
- Counties of the Commonwealth of Massachusetts
  - County seats in Massachusetts
  - commons:Category:Counties in Massachusetts
- Crime in Massachusetts
- Culture of Massachusetts
  - commons:Category:Massachusetts culture

== D ==
- Demographics of Massachusetts
- Dominion of New-England in America, 1686–1689

== E ==
- Economy of Massachusetts
  - Category:Economy of Massachusetts
    - commons:Category:Economy of Massachusetts
- Education in Massachusetts
  - Category:Education in Massachusetts
    - commons:Category:Education in Massachusetts
- Elections in Massachusetts
  - Category:Elections in Massachusetts
    - commons:Category:Elections in Massachusetts
- Environment of Massachusetts
  - commons:Category:Environment of Massachusetts

== F ==
The Flag of the Commonwealth of Massachusetts

- Festivals in Massachusetts
  - commons:Category:Festivals in Massachusetts
- Flag of the Commonwealth of Massachusetts
- Forts in Massachusetts
  - Category:Forts in Massachusetts
    - commons:Category:Forts in Massachusetts

== G ==
The Great Seal of the Commonwealth of Massachusetts

- Gambling in Massachusetts
- Geography of Massachusetts
  - Category:Geography of Massachusetts
    - commons:Category:Geography of Massachusetts
- Geology of Massachusetts
  - commons:Category:Geology of Massachusetts
- Ghost towns in Massachusetts
  - Category:Ghost towns in Massachusetts
    - commons:Category:Ghost towns in Massachusetts
- Golf clubs and courses in Massachusetts
- Government of the Commonwealth of Massachusetts website
  - Category:Government of Massachusetts
    - commons:Category:Government of Massachusetts
- Governor of the Commonwealth of Massachusetts
  - List of governors of Massachusetts
- Great Seal of the Commonwealth of Massachusetts
- Greater Boston

== H ==
- Heritage railroads in Massachusetts
  - commons:Category:Heritage railroads in Massachusetts
- High schools of Massachusetts
- Higher education in Massachusetts
- Highway routes in Massachusetts
- Hiking trails in Massachusetts
  - commons:Category:Hiking trails in Massachusetts
- History of Massachusetts
  - Historical outline of Massachusetts
    - Category:History of Massachusetts
      - commons:Category:History of Massachusetts
- Hospitals in Massachusetts
- House of Representatives of the Commonwealth of Massachusetts

== I ==
- Images of Massachusetts
  - commons:Category:Massachusetts
- International Institute of New England
- Islands of Massachusetts

== L ==
- Lakes of Massachusetts
  - commons:Category:Lakes of Massachusetts
- Landmarks in Massachusetts
  - commons:Category:Landmarks in Massachusetts
- Laws of the Commonwealth of Massachusetts
- Lieutenant Governor of the Commonwealth of Massachusetts
- Lists related to the Commonwealth of Massachusetts:
  - List of airports in Massachusetts
  - List of census statistical areas in Massachusetts
  - List of cities in Massachusetts
  - List of colleges and universities in Massachusetts
  - List of colonial governors of Massachusetts
  - List of United States congressional districts in Massachusetts
  - List of counties in Massachusetts
  - List of county seats in Massachusetts
  - List of forts in Massachusetts
  - List of ghost towns in Massachusetts
  - List of governors of Massachusetts
  - List of high schools in Massachusetts
  - List of highway routes in Massachusetts
  - List of hospitals in Massachusetts
  - List of islands of Massachusetts
  - List of law enforcement agencies in Massachusetts
  - List of lieutenant governors of Massachusetts
  - List of Massachusetts municipal seals and flags
  - List of museums in Massachusetts
  - List of National Historic Landmarks in Massachusetts
  - List of newspapers in Massachusetts
  - List of people from Massachusetts
  - List of radio stations in Massachusetts
  - List of railroads in Massachusetts
  - List of Registered Historic Places in Massachusetts
  - List of rivers of Massachusetts
  - List of school districts in Massachusetts
  - List of state forests in Massachusetts
  - List of state parks in Massachusetts
  - List of state prisons in Massachusetts
  - List of symbols of the Commonwealth of Massachusetts
  - List of telephone area codes in Massachusetts
  - List of television stations in Massachusetts
  - List of towns in Massachusetts
  - List of wired multiple-system broadband providers in Massachusetts (by municipality)
  - List of Massachusetts's congressional delegations
  - List of United States congressional districts in Massachusetts
  - List of United States representatives from Massachusetts
  - List of United States senators from Massachusetts

== M ==
- MA – United States Postal Service postal code for the Commonwealth of Massachusetts
- Maps of Massachusetts
  - commons:Category:Maps of Massachusetts
- Massachusetts website
  - Category:Massachusetts
    - commons:Category:Massachusetts
- Massachusetts Archives
- Massachusetts ballot measures, 2006
- Massachusetts Consumers' Coalition
- Massachusetts Corporation for Educational Telecommunications
- Massachusetts Department of Conservation and Recreation
- Massachusetts health care reform
- Massachusetts Highway Department
- Massachusetts Medal of Liberty
- Massachusetts Port Authority
- Massachusetts Promise Fellowship
- Massachusetts State House
- Massachusetts State Police
- Massachusetts Department of Correction
- Massachusetts Turnpike Authority
- Monuments and memorials in Massachusetts
  - commons:Category:Monuments and memorials in Massachusetts
- Mountains of Massachusetts
  - commons:Category:Mountains of Massachusetts
- Museums in Massachusetts
  - Category:Museums in Massachusetts
    - commons:Category:Museums in Massachusetts
- Music of Massachusetts
  - commons:Category:Music of Massachusetts
  - Category:Musical groups from Massachusetts
  - Category:Musicians from Massachusetts

== N ==
- Natural arches of Massachusetts
  - commons:Category:Natural arches of Massachusetts
- Natural history of Massachusetts
  - commons:Category:Natural history of Massachusetts
- Nature centers in Massachusetts
  - commons:Category:Nature centers in Massachusetts
- Natural Resource Protection Zoning
- New England
- News media in Massachusetts
- Newspapers of Massachusetts

== O ==
- Outdoor sculptures in Massachusetts
  - commons:Category:Outdoor sculptures in Massachusetts

== P ==
- People from Massachusetts
  - Category:People from Massachusetts
    - commons:Category:People from Massachusetts
    - Category:People from Massachusetts by populated place
    - Category:People from Massachusetts by county
    - Category:People from Massachusetts by occupation
- Plimouth, capital of Colony of New-Plimouth 1620-1686 and 1688–1691
- Politics of Massachusetts
  - commons:Category:Politics of Massachusetts
- Proposition 2½-the 1980s-era Massachusetts state property tax and excise tax for automobiles rate limitation to 2.5%
- Protected areas of Massachusetts
  - commons:Category:Protected areas of Massachusetts

== R ==
- Radio stations in Massachusetts
- Railroad museums in Massachusetts
  - commons:Category:Railroad museums in Massachusetts
- Railroads in Massachusetts
- Registered historic places in Massachusetts
  - commons:Category:Registered Historic Places in Massachusetts
- Religion in Massachusetts
  - Category:Religion in Massachusetts
    - commons:Category:Religion in Massachusetts
- Rivers of Massachusetts
  - commons:Category:Rivers of Massachusetts
- Rock formations in Massachusetts
  - commons:Category:Rock formations in Massachusetts
- Roller coasters in Massachusetts
  - commons:Category:Roller coasters in Massachusetts

== S ==
- School districts of Massachusetts
- Scouting in Massachusetts
- Senate of the Commonwealth of Massachusetts
- Settlements in Massachusetts
  - Cities in Massachusetts
  - Towns in Massachusetts
  - Villages in Massachusetts
  - Census Designated Places in Massachusetts
  - Other unincorporated communities in Massachusetts
  - List of ghost towns in Massachusetts
- Ski areas and resorts in Massachusetts
  - commons:Category:Ski areas and resorts in Massachusetts
- Sports in Massachusetts
  - Category:Sports in Massachusetts
    - commons:Category:Sports in Massachusetts
  - Category:Sports venues in Massachusetts
    - commons:Category:Sports venues in Massachusetts
- State of Massachusetts - see: Commonwealth of Massachusetts
- State of Massachusetts Bay, 1776–1780;
- State parks of Massachusetts
  - commons:Category:State parks of Massachusetts
- State Police of Massachusetts
- State prisons of Massachusetts
- Structures in Massachusetts
  - commons:Category:Buildings and structures in Massachusetts
- Supreme Court of the Commonwealth of Massachusetts
- Symbols of the Commonwealth of Massachusetts
  - Category:Symbols of Massachusetts
    - commons:Category:Symbols of Massachusetts

== T ==
- Taxation in Massachusetts
  - Category:Taxation in Massachusetts
- Telecommunications in Massachusetts
  - commons:Category:Communications in Massachusetts
- Telephone area codes in Massachusetts
- Television shows set in Massachusetts
- Television stations in Massachusetts
- Theatres in Massachusetts
  - commons:Category:Theatres in Massachusetts
- Tourism in Massachusetts website
  - commons:Category:Tourism in Massachusetts
- Towns in Massachusetts
  - commons:Category:Cities in Massachusetts
- Transportation in Massachusetts
  - Category:Transportation in Massachusetts
    - commons:Category:Transport in Massachusetts
- Trauma centers in Massachusetts
- Treasurer of the Commonwealth of Massachusetts

== U ==
- United States of America
  - States of the United States of America
  - United States census statistical areas of Massachusetts
  - Massachusetts's congressional delegations
  - United States congressional districts in Massachusetts
  - United States Court of Appeals for the First Circuit
  - United States District Court for the District of Massachusetts
  - United States representatives from Massachusetts
  - United States senators from Massachusetts
- Universities and colleges in Massachusetts
  - commons:Category:Universities and colleges in Massachusetts
- US-MA – ISO 3166-2:US region code for the Commonwealth of Massachusetts

== W ==
- Waterfalls of Massachusetts
  - commons:Category:Waterfalls of Massachusetts
  Wikimedia
  - Wikimedia Commons:Category:Massachusetts
    - commons:Category:Maps of Massachusetts
  - Wikinews:Category:Massachusetts
    - Wikinews:Portal:Massachusetts
  - Wikipedia Category:Massachusetts
    - Wikipedia Portal:Massachusetts
    - Wikipedia:WikiProject Massachusetts
      - Category:WikiProject Massachusetts articles
      - Category:WikiProject Massachusetts participants

== Z ==
- Zoos in Massachusetts
  - commons:Category:Zoos in Massachusetts

== See also ==
- Topic overview:
  - Massachusetts
  - Outline of Massachusetts
