= List of Indiana state symbols =

Location of the state of Indiana in the United States, highlighted in red.

The U.S. state of Indiana has 17 official state emblems, as well as other designated official and unofficial items. The majority of the symbols in the list are officially recognized and created by an act of the Indiana General Assembly and signed into law by the governor. They are listed in Indiana Code Title 1, Article 2, State Emblems which also regulates the appearance and applicable use of the items.

Compared to other states, Indiana has few official symbols. The first symbol was the Seal of Indiana, which was made official in 1801 for the Indiana Territory and again in 1816 by the state of Indiana. It served as the state's only emblem for nearly a century until the adoption of the state song in 1913. For many years, Indiana was the only state without a flag. The official state banner was adopted in 1917, and renamed the state flag in 1955. The newest symbol of Indiana is the state fossil, mastodon, which was declared in 2022.

== Insignia ==
Type	Symbol	Description	Adopted	Image	Ref.
Flag	Flag of Indiana	Indiana's flag has a blue background with a torch in the center. The torch is surrounded by nineteen stars: the thirteen in the outer ring representing the original colonies, the five in the inner ring representing the next five states admitted (prior to Indiana), and the one on top of the torch representing Indiana.	1917	Indiana flag	
Motto	Crossroads of America	Indiana is the site of many cross-country roads, including the National Road and U.S. Route 41.	1937	Indiana's motto, Crossroads of America, on a state welcome sign.	
Seal	Seal of Indiana	Indiana's seal depicts a setting sun, sycamore trees, a woodsman, and a jumping bison.	1816	Indiana State Seal	

== Species ==
Type	Symbol	Description	Adopted	Image	Ref.
Bird	Northern cardinal (Cardinalis cardinalis)^{[A]}	The male cardinal is bright red and the female is brown and dull red. They live in Indiana year-round.	1933	Northern cardinal	
Flower	Peony (Paeonia)^{[B]}	The peony is a red, pink, or white flower that blooms in late May. It is grown throughout Indiana.	1957	Peony	
Fossil	Mastodon (Mammut americanum)	Mastodons roamed Indiana starting about 2.5 million years ago and became extinct about 10,500 years ago. Mastodons are now the most common Ice Age fossil found in Indiana.	2022	Mastodon fossils	
Insect	Say's firefly (Pyractomena angulata)	The males of this flying beetle species produce amber flashes of light at night to attract mates. It is named for naturalist Thomas Say of New Harmony, Indiana.	2018	A lightning bug on a leaf	
Tree	Tulip tree (Liriodendron tulipifera)	The tulip tree is also called the yellow poplar. It has a distinctive leaf shape and yellow, bell-shaped flowers. It is a tall tree and grows throughout Indiana.	1931	Tulip tree blossoms	

== Geology ==
Type	Symbol	Description	Adopted	Image	Ref.
River	Wabash River	Beginning near the Ohio–Indiana border, the Wabash flows for more than 500 miles (800 km) across Northern Indiana, turning southward where it forms a portion of the Illinois–Indiana border. It is the second-largest tributary to the Ohio River and is the longest segment of free-flowing river east of the Mississippi River.	1996	Map of Wabash River and watershed	
Stone	Indiana limestone	The Indiana variety of limestone, also called Salem or Bedford, is significantly quarried in south-central Indiana. It is a high-quality stone used in the construction of many prominent civic buildings across the U.S., including the Empire State Building and the Pentagon. A sculpture commemorating the state stone sits in the Indiana Statehouse.	1971	Indiana limestone	

== Culture ==
Type	Symbol	Description	Adopted	Image	Ref.
Aircraft	Republic P-47 Thunderbolt Hoosier Spirit II	The Republic P-47 Thunderbolt was a World War II-era fighter aircraft manufactured at Republic Aviation's Evansville, Indiana, plant. In 2021, the statute was amended to specifically designate the Hoosier Spirit II, one of 6,242 aircraft built at the plant. Hoosier Spirit II is displayed at the Evansville Wartime Museum.	2015	—	
Firearm	Grouseland Rifle	The Grouseland Rifle is a long rifle crafted in the early-1800s by gunsmith John Small for then-governor of the Indiana Territory, William Henry Harrison. The firearm is displayed in Vincennes, Indiana, at its namesake Grouseland.	2012	—	
Languages	English; American Sign Language	English is the native language of over 95% of the state's residents.	1984; 1995	Indiana Governor Eric Holcomb (left) and American Sign Language interpreter	
Poem	"Indiana"	"Indiana" is by Arthur Franklin Mapes, the former Indiana State Poet Laureate. The poem describes the state's natural beauty.	1963	—	
Poet laureate	Curtis L. Crisler	Represents Indiana and the art of poetry to the education community and the public.	2005	—	
Snack	Indiana grown popcorn	According to the USDA, Indiana was the nation's largest popcorn producer in 2021. Nearly 100,000 acres (40,000 ha) were devoted to growing popcorn (particularly in White and Pulaski counties) valued at US$100 million. Orville Redenbacher's and Pop Weaver are popular popcorn brands originated in Indiana.	2021	Popped popcorn	
Song	"On the Banks of the Wabash, Far Away"	The song was written and composed by songwriter Paul Dresser reminiscing about his childhood home along the Wabash River in Terre Haute, Indiana.	1913	Sheet music cover, "On the Banks of the Wabash, Far Away"	

== Unofficial symbols and unsuccessful proposals ==
While most states have an official nickname, the Indiana General Assembly never officially adopted one. Indiana's unofficial nickname is The Hoosier State. A word of unknown origin, Hoosier is the official demonym for the people of Indiana.

The state has had several unofficial marketing slogans through the years, including "Restart Your Engines" (2006–2014), "Honest-to-Goodness Indiana" (2014–2022), and most recently, "IN Indiana".

Indiana's unofficial state soil, Miami, is a brown silt loam found widely across the state. The soil is productive for cultivation, contributing to the state's robust agricultural economy.

The Indiana Senate approved a resolution naming water as the official state beverage in 2007.

Sugar cream pie (or "Hoosier Pie") was designated the "unofficial state pie" in 2009.

The Purdue Wine Grape Team advocated for Traminette to be Indiana's state wine in 2011 and 2019, citing its selection "due to its outstanding quality and versatility."

== Notes ==
^{A} At the time, the northern cardinal's scientific name was Richmondena Cardianalis Cardinalis. It was changed in 1983.
^{B} From 1923 to 1931, the state flower was the flower of the tulip tree. From 1931 to 1957, the state flower was the Zinnia.

== See also ==
- Lists of United States state insignia
