= List of Massachusetts state symbols =

Location of the Commonwealth of Massachusetts in the United States of America

This is a list of official symbols of the United States Commonwealth of Massachusetts. Official symbols of the commonwealth are codified in Chapter 2 of the Massachusetts General Laws.

== State symbols ==
Coat of Arms
M.G.L. Ch. 2, §1

Seal of Massachusetts
M.G.L. Ch. 2, §2

Flag of Massachusetts
M.G.L. Ch. 2, §3

Governor's Flag
M.G.L. Ch. 2, §4

Overview of Massachusetts state symbols
Type	Symbol	Law
Flower	Mayflower	M.G.L. Ch. 2, §7
Tree	American elm	M.G.L. Ch. 2, §8
Bird	Chickadee	M.G.L. Ch. 2, §9
Beverage	Cranberry juice	M.G.L. Ch. 2, §10
Horse	Morgan horse	M.G.L. Ch. 2, §11
Insect	Lady bug	M.G.L. Ch. 2, §12
Fish	Atlantic Cod	M.G.L. Ch. 2, §13
Dog	Boston Terrier	M.G.L. Ch. 2, §14
Gem	Rhodonite	M.G.L. Ch. 2, §15
Marine mammal	Right whale	M.G.L. Ch. 2, §16
Fossil	Dinosaur track	M.G.L. Ch. 2, §17
Mineral	Babingtonite	M.G.L. Ch. 2, §18
Song	"All Hail to Massachusetts" by Arthur J. Marsh	M.G.L. Ch. 2, §19
Folk song	"Massachusetts" by Arlo Guthrie	M.G.L. Ch. 2, §20
Poem	"Blue Hills of Massachusetts"	M.G.L. Ch. 2, §21
Rock	Roxbury puddingstone	M.G.L. Ch. 2, §22
Historical rock	Plymouth Rock	M.G.L. Ch. 2, §23
Explorer rock	Dighton Rock	M.G.L. Ch. 2, §24
Building and monument stone	Granite	M.G.L. Ch. 2, §25
Heroine	Deborah Sampson	M.G.L. Ch. 2, §26
Hero	Samuel Whittemore	
Ceremonial march	"The Road to Boston"	M.G.L. Ch. 2, §27
Muffin	Corn muffin	M.G.L. Ch. 2, §28
Shell	New England Neptune (Neptunea lyrata decemcostata)	M.G.L. Ch. 2, §29
Cat	Tabby cat	M.G.L. Ch. 2, §30
Patriotic song	"Massachusetts (Because of You Our Land is Free)"	M.G.L. Ch. 2, §31
Folk dance	Square dance	M.G.L. Ch. 2, §32
Soil	Paxton Soil Series	M.G.L. Ch. 2, §33
Vietnam veterans' memorial	Worcester Vietnam Veterans' Memorial	M.G.L. Ch. 2, §34
Designation of residents	Bay Staters	M.G.L. Ch. 2, §35
Game bird	Wild turkey	M.G.L. Ch. 2, §36
Southwest Asia War Veterans' Memorial	Worcester Southwest Asia War Veterans' Memorial	M.G.L. Ch. 2, §37
Bean	Baked navy bean	M.G.L. Ch. 2, §38
Berry	Cranberry	M.G.L. Ch. 2, §39
Folk hero	Johnny Appleseed	M.G.L. Ch. 2, §40
Dessert	Boston cream pie	M.G.L. Ch. 2, §41
Cookie	Chocolate chip cookie	M.G.L. Ch. 2, §42
Glee club song	"The Great State of Massachusetts"	M.G.L. Ch. 2, §43
Polka	"Say Hello to Someone in Massachusetts"	M.G.L. Ch. 2, §44
Peace statue	Massachusetts Peace Statue	M.G.L. Ch. 2, §45
Korean War memorial	Charlestown Navy Yard Korean War Memorial	M.G.L. Ch. 2, §46
Ode	"Ode to Massachusetts"	M.G.L. Ch. 2, §47
MIA/POW memorial	Massachusetts National Cemetery MIA/POW Memorial	M.G.L. Ch. 2, §48
Children's book	Make Way for Ducklings	M.G.L. Ch. 2, §49
Children's author and children's illustrator	Theodor "Dr. Seuss" Geisel	M.G.L. Ch. 2, §50
Donut	Boston cream donut	M.G.L. Ch. 2, §51
District tartan	Bay State Tartan	M.G.L. Ch. 2, §52
Colors	Blue, green, and cranberry	M.G.L. Ch. 2, §53
Blues artist	Taj Mahal	M.G.L. Ch. 2, §54
Sport	Basketball	M.G.L. Ch. 2, §55
Inventor	Benjamin Franklin	Acts of 2006; Ch. 364
Reptile	Garter snake	Acts of 2006; Ch. 425
Artist	Norman Rockwell	Acts of 2008; Ch. 45
Dinosaur	Podokesaurus holyokensis	Bill S.2028 (2022)

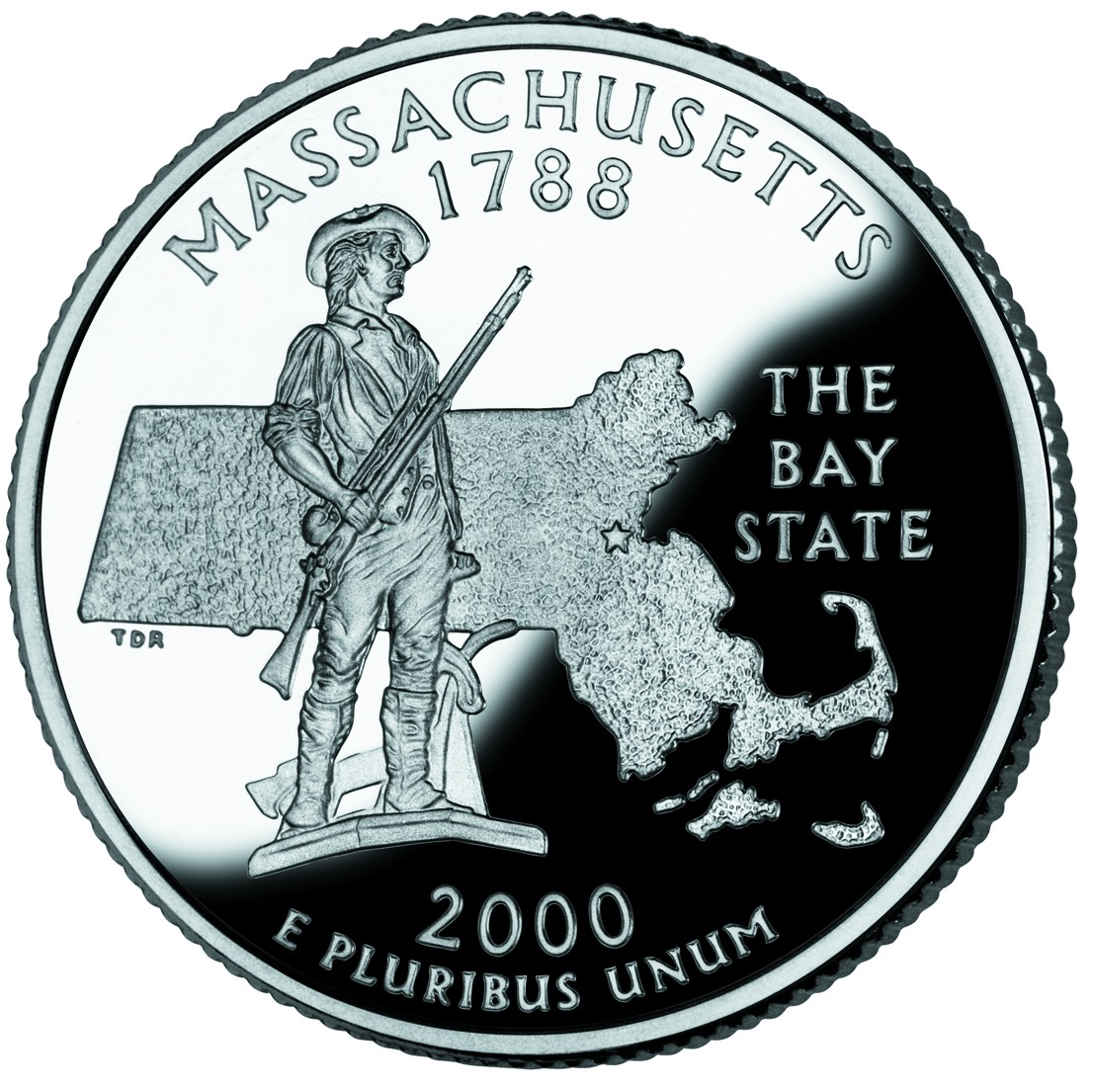
- United States quarter dollar – Massachusetts 2000:

== See also ==
- Ense petit placidam sub libertate quietem
- Commonwealth of Massachusetts
- List of Massachusetts-related topics
- List of Massachusetts municipal seals and flags
- List of U.S. state minerals, rocks, stones and gemstones
- Lists of United States state insignia
- Sacred Cod

== Notes ==
- Chapter 162 of the Acts of 1997: An Act Designating the Song "The Great State of Massachusetts" as the State Glee Club Song
- Chapter 17 of the Acts of 2003: An Act Designating the Bay State Tartan as the Official Tartan of the Commonwealth
- Chapter 407 of the Acts of 2004: An Act Designating the Official Colors of the Commonwealth
- Chapter 19 of the Acts of 2006: An Act Designating Taj Mahal as the Official Blues Artist of the Commonwealth
- Chapter 215 of the Acts of 2006: [h
