= Blue Hills of Massachusetts =

Official poem of Massachusetts

- by Katherine E. Mullen
- Written: 1957–1967
- Country: United States
- Language: English
- Subject: Massachusetts

"Blue Hills of Massachusetts", written by schoolteacher Katherine E. Mullen of Barre, is a poem originally written to teach children about the history of Massachusetts and some of its significant symbols. It was designated the official poem of Massachusetts in 1981.

== Origin ==
Katherine E. Mullen was a teacher in the Barre public school system for sixty years. She wrote the poem "Blue Hills of Massachusetts" between 1957 and 1967 as a teaching tool, wanting to stress the good parts of the state. She used ten verses to explain the significance of symbols such as the state flag and seal. State Senator Robert D. Wetmore said about it, "Nearly every aspect of Massachusetts history is touched upon in its verses."

== Effort to designate as the official state poem ==
In 1980, Mullen visited the school again for a ceremony around its flagpole, where sixth graders sang several verses of the poem. Senator Wetmore read about the ceremony and thought that it should be designated as the official state song. However, since there was already a state song, Mullen suggested that it instead be considered for being the official state poem. In March 1981, the legislative Committee on State Administration held a hearing on the matter, where Stephen Brewer, then a selectman of the Town of Barre, testified in favor saying it was "an upbeat affirmation of that unique spirit of Massachusetts that is positive and hard working and diligent."

The bill that Wetmore sponsored was approved by the state legislature and signed by Governor Edward J. King. The bill was officially enacted on September 24, 1981 as chapter 402 of the Acts of 1981, which added section 21 to chapter 2 of the General Laws of Massachusetts reading, "The poem, 'Blue Hills of Massachusetts' composed by Katherine E. Mullen of the town of Barre shall be the official state poem of the commonwealth."

== Controversy ==
The poem has stanzas that honor the state seal and flag, which have been criticized as glorifying institutional racism. In 2026, State Representative Jack Patrick Lewis filed a bill to change the official state poem to "Song of Massachusetts" by Regie Gibson instead.

== See also ==
- List of U.S. state poems
