= View tax =

Tendency for a real-estate tax to include subjective measures

The view tax is a term for the fact that the appraisal of a piece of real estate in preparation for assessing property tax includes aspects of a property that are subjective, such as its view. It was also the informal name for a 2005 bill in the legislature of the U.S. state of New Hampshire (see below).

Some municipalities have used an explicit "view tax" since 2003, itemizing the view from a property as a separate line item with a dollar amount. But the New Hampshire Assessing Standards Board has held that the view is merely one factor in determining the fair market value of a property; as a property with a nicer view will command a higher market price, an assessor should consider the view, like any other desirable amenity. This implies that a "view tax" would be at least an implicit component of all property taxes in New Hampshire.

The desirability of a view is subjective compared to other aspects of a property's value. The remedy for this is to ensure that the value is in line with recent sales of comparable properties.

Scenic views are one factor that attracts home buyers from outside the community. When they pay large premiums for properties, with or without houses on them, it inevitably inflates the (potential) value of adjacent parcels. Revaluation eventually reflects this fact and subjects abutters to tax increases even in the absence of any change either to their property or to their ability to pay the tax. The increment may be regarded as a "view tax." It would affect not just luxury properties but properties that are small and in poor repair, for which the view might not be a relevant attraction.

Current use is a program in which New Hampshire properties are assessed at their current use (such as unproductive forest) rather than its "highest and best use" (such as a resort development). If a scenic view augments the property's highest and best use, while being irrelevant to its current use, this increases the value of putting the property in current use. The designation does not apply to "improved" portions of the land, such as houses and other structures, nor to parcels smaller than 10 acres (40,000 m^{2}), so including the view as a factor in appraisals may affect smaller parcels disproportionately. A dissatisfied owner of an affected parcel may complain that he was assessed with a "view tax."

== 2005 legislation ==
The "view tax" referred to an impetus in the New Hampshire legislature in 2005 to increase the property tax rate on property with a “pleasing view.” House Bill 245 would not have imposed a tax, but merely would have set up a committee of six legislators to “study the processes for valuing water frontage and views of scenic areas”. It was sent to interim study and not passed by either house of the legislature.

In 2012, a legislative committee rejected House Bill 1393, which would have mandated that assessors use the sales comparison approach. The minority proposed an amendment to specify that “In no case shall a separate addition of the value of a view be included in the assessment under the sales comparison approach.”

== Portugal ==
In 2016, the Socialist government in Portugal authorized, at the option of the local councils, property tax on certain parcels valued above €250,000 to increase by up to 20% or decrease by up to 10% based on the desirability of the view from the property. Proponents cited social justice, while opponents called it subjective.
