= Vermont Natural Resources Council =

American non-profit environmental advocacy group

- Vermont Natural Resources Council Inc.
- Abbreviation: VNRC
- Formation: 1963; 63 years ago
- Type: Nonprofit
- Tax ID no.: 03-0223731
- Legal status: 501(c)(3)
- Headquarters: Montpelier, Vermont
- Location: United States
- Board Chair: Will Lintilhac
- Executive Director: Brian Shupe
- Board of directors: Will Lintilhac; Maisie Anrod; Steph Baer; Kathy Beyer; Megan Camp; Jameson C. Davis; Judy Dow; Elizabeth Gibson; Charlie Hancock; Nolan Holmes; Mark Nelson; Bindu Panikkar; Diane Snelling; Peter Sterling
- Website: https://vnrc.org/

The Vermont Natural Resources Council (VNRC) is a non-profit environmental advocacy group headquartered at Montpelier in the U.S. state of Vermont. Founded in 1963, the organization works to protect Vermont's natural resources and environment through research, education, and advocacy.

== Program work ==
VNRC focuses on four major program areas: energy, forests and biodiversity, sustainable communities, and water.

Recent successes include:

- Passage of Vermont's groundwater law that designates groundwater a public trust;
- Passage of a new wetlands protection law
- Protection and strengthening of the Fair Use Appraisal Value property tax program, also known as 'Current Use,' which eases the pressure on farm and forest owners to sell their working land for property development
- Monitoring Vermont's 'Growth Center' law for proper application as municipalities around the state apply for growth center designation;
- Passage of an energy bill that allows "Clean Energy Assessment Districts" to be established by municipalities; municipalities can then use their bonding authority to make loans to homeowners for energy-efficiency or renewable energy projects to be paid back gradually through years of property taxes.

== Publications ==
VNRC publishes several publications, including the Vermont Environmental Report and the Legislative Bulletin. VNRC also produces videos concerning environmental issues and legislative happenings.

== Partnerships ==
VNRC is the Vermont affiliate of the National Wildlife Federation.

VNRC is one of the partners in the Vermont Energy and Climate Action Network (VECAN)

== Staff and board ==
VNRC's staff consists of 11 people: Executive Director, four Program Directors, Director of Development, Membership Director, Outreach Director, Staff Scientist, Communications Director, and Office Manager. VNRC's Board of Directors includes 13 members.
