= Woodlot =

Plot of land for forest products production

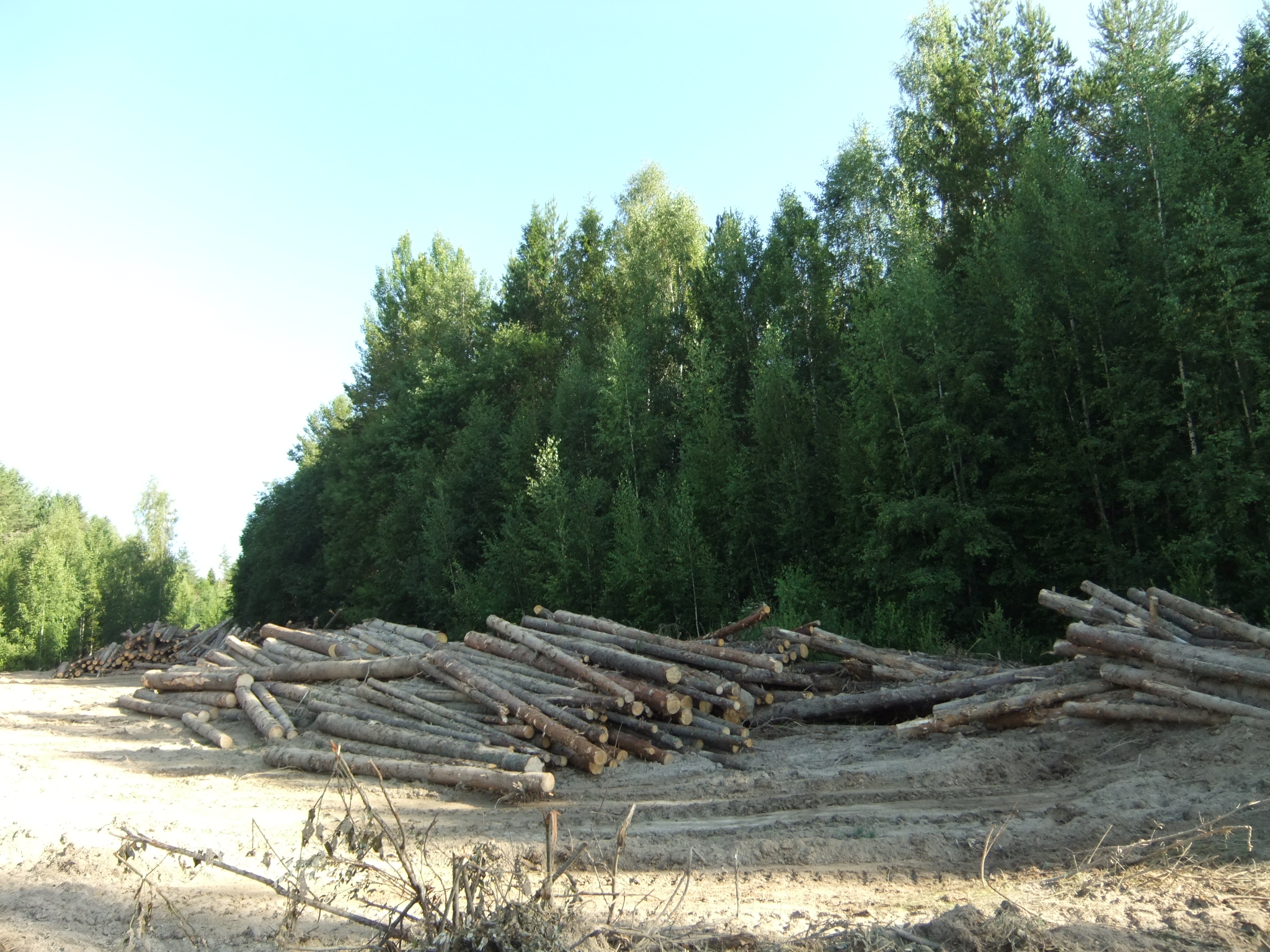
Remaining woodlot as seen in Serbia.

A woodlot is a parcel of a woodland or forest capable of small-scale production of forest products (such as wood fuel, sap for maple syrup, sawlogs, and pulpwood) as well as recreational uses like bird watching, bushwalking, and wildflower appreciation. The term woodlot is chiefly North American; in Britain, a woodlot would be called a wood, woodland, or copse.

Many woodlots occur as part of a farm or as buffers and undevelopable land between these and other property types such as housing subdivisions, industrial forests, or public properties (highways, parks, watersheds, etc.). Very small woodlots can occur where a subdivision has not met its development potential, or where terrain does not easily permit other uses. Very large woodlots (hundreds of acres) might emerge where profitable wood species have been depleted by commercial logging practices or compromised by diseases, leaving little choice but to divide and liquidate the real estate for other purposes.

One distinguishing characteristic of a woodlot is that the parcel size or quality of wood on the parcel does not generally justify full-scale commercial harvesting, leaving many woodlots as private investments by individuals. On the other hand, good forest management practices, even on a small scale, may create a sustainable source of products, which can significantly contribute to the aggregate inventory available to forest-product consumers.

== Woodlot economics ==
In the era when family farming employed a large percentage of the population in the United States and Canada, it was typical of prized parcels of farmland that they included a woodlot from which the family could harvest firewood, wood for buildings and wagons, and wood for repair work. On the Great Plains woodlots were scarce, but not so elsewhere. In New England and Ontario especially, making sugar from sugar maple sap was an important part of farm life.

Today, a woodlot of a generally noncommercial nature may make it difficult to justify the expense of ownership, capital equipment, management, and harvesting, unless some revenue can be added to the intangible benefits.

Some jurisdictions encourage woodlots (over subdivisions) by providing property tax reductions (see, e.g., Current use) or by subsidized consulting and management plans. For example, a state or provincial government may recognize the important contributions that small, non-industrial land owners make to conservation of natural resources, and provide administrative tools, information and even funding.

There may also be income tax advantages for those who are able to operate their woodlot as a small business, or even as a passive investment (e.g., capital equipment depreciation, inventory depletion and operating expense deductions).

Depending on soils, aspect, parcel size and plant species and age, a properly managed woodlot might provide sufficient firewood annually for heating a number of local homes, as well as sawlogs and poles for periodic construction or repair of out-buildings. In fact, some states (including New Hampshire) grant woodlot owners an exemption from harvest "yield taxes" otherwise payable on limited quantities taken for personal use. A suitably capable and equipped woodlot owner may enjoy doing the work himself (simple forestry, road-building, selective logging, firewood processing, etc.). Others might prefer sharing the costs with similarly situated neighbors to have several adjacent parcels managed simultaneously by local loggers. Otherwise, hiring professionals to reap small quantities of firewood may be too expensive to be cost-effective.

With the relatively high cost of fossil fuels for heating, a personal woodlot may be held as a biomass energy "savings account". When fuel prices go up, the woodlot pays for itself by providing firewood. When fuel prices go down, the woodlot can be left to mature, or managed for improved output of other products with an eventual higher profit.

However, because of the slow nature of tree growth (for most valuable firewood trees), the profitability of many woodlots must be viewed as a long-term investment, with 20 to 50 years of management necessary before harvesting at a profit. Furthermore, in areas undergoing development, market pressures may ultimately result in poorly managed woodlots being sold and subdivided, often merely because property taxes become unbearable.

== See also ==
- Conservation development
- Forest protection
- Plantation
- Sustainable forest management
- Urban rural fringe
- Woodland management
