= Ense petit placidam sub libertate quietem =

Official motto of the Commonwealth of Massachusetts

Ense petit placidam sub libertate quietem used on the coat of arms of Massachusetts

Ense petit placidam sub libertate quietem is a Latin dactylic hexameter and the official motto of the U.S. Commonwealth of Massachusetts and the University of Massachusetts Amherst. The phrase is often loosely translated into English as "By the sword we seek peace, but peace only under liberty." The literal translation, however, is "she seeks with the sword peaceful repose under liberty." The "she" in question refers to the word manus from the full phrase manus haec inimica tyrannis ense petit placidam sub libertate quietem, which includes the end of a preceding hexameter and means "this hand, an enemy to tyrants, seeks with the sword peaceful repose under liberty."

The poem out of which the verse is taken was written c. 1660 by the English soldier-statesman Algernon Sidney, who was an opponent of Charles II and who was later executed for treason. The motto was first adopted in 1775 by the Massachusetts General Court (the official name of the state legislature) and applied to the temporary seal of Massachusetts. On December 13, 1780, the legislature approved its application to the current Great Seal of Massachusetts.

== See also ==
- List of Massachusetts state symbols
- Flag of Massachusetts
- List of U.S. state and territory mottos
