= I Am Florida =

State poem of Florida

- by Allen Autry Sr.

I Am Florida is the state poem of the U.S. state of Florida, written by Allen Autry Sr.. It was endorsed by Governor Charlie Crist and the Florida Cabinet on October 12, 2010.

A musical version, written, produced, and recorded by Walter "Clyde" Orange, a founding member, lead vocalist, and principal lyricist of the musical group The Commodores, and Lucas and Adrian Rezza of 80Empire and was officially recognized as one of the official state songs of Florida by the Florida Senate in 2013.
