= Adrian Matejka =

American poet and editor (born 1971)

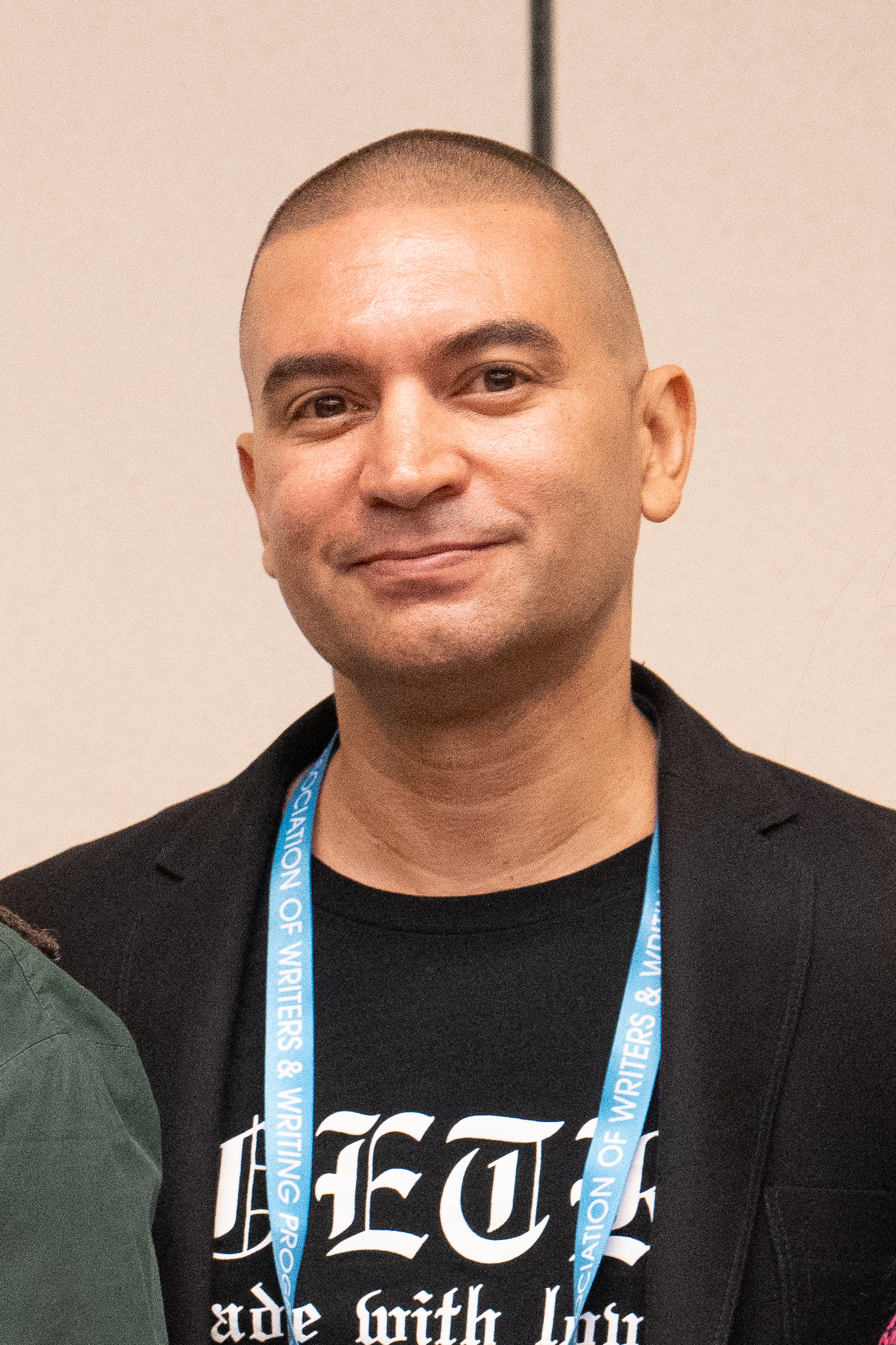
- Matejka at AWP 2026
- Born: 1971 (age 54–55); Nuremberg, Germany
- Education: Indiana University Bloomington (BA); Southern Illinois University Carbondale (MFA)
- Occupations: Poet, editor
- Writing career
- Genre: Poetry
- Notable work: The Big Smoke
- Notable awards: Anisfield-Wolf Book Award; Guggenheim Fellowship

Adrian Matejka (born 1971) is an American poet and editor. He is the editor-in-chief of Poetry magazine, a position he has held since 2022. He is the author of six poetry collections and the graphic novel Last on His Feet: Jack Johnson and the Battle of the Century. His poetry collection The Big Smoke won the Anisfield-Wolf Book Award and was a finalist for the National Book Award for Poetry and the Pulitzer Prize for Poetry. Matejka served as Indiana poet laureate from 2018 to 2019.

== Life ==
Matejka was born in Nuremberg, Germany, in 1971 and grew up in California and Indianapolis, Indiana. He received a BA from Indiana University Bloomington in 1995 and an MFA from SIU in 2001.

Interview with Matejka at the University of Southern Indiana about The Big Smoke

Matejka's third collection, The Big Smoke, is about the boxer Jack Johnson. The book was a finalist for the 2013 National Book Award for Poetry and the 2014 Pulitzer Prize for Poetry, and won a 2014 Anisfield-Wolf Book Award.

Matejka has taught literature and creative writing at Indiana University Bloomington. He served as Indiana poet laureate from 2018 to 2019. In 2022, he became editor-in-chief of Poetry magazine. The Poetry Foundation described him as the first Black editor to lead the magazine.

== Honors and awards ==
- 2003: New York/New England Award for The Devil's Garden.
- 2008: National Poetry Series, for Mixology.
- 2011: Lannan Foundation residency.
- 2013: National Book Award for Poetry finalist, for The Big Smoke.
- 2014: Anisfield-Wolf Book Award, for The Big Smoke.
- 2014: Hurston/Wright Legacy Award finalist, for The Big Smoke.
- 2014: Pulitzer Prize for Poetry finalist, for The Big Smoke.
- 2014: Guggenheim Fellowship in poetry.
- 2014: Lannan Literary Fellowship for poetry.
- 2015: United States Artists fellowship.
- 2015: Eugene and Marilyn Glick Indiana Authors Award regional award.
- 2019: Academy of American Poets Laureate Fellowship.
- 2019: National Endowment for the Arts creative writing fellowship in poetry.
- 2022: UNT Rilke Prize finalist, for Somebody Else Sold the World.
- 2022: Indiana Authors Award poetry shortlist, for Somebody Else Sold the World.

Other honors include a Pushcart Prize, the Julia Peterkin Award, two Illinois Arts Council Literary Awards, a Cave Canem fellowship, a Rockefeller Foundation fellowship, and a Civitella Ranieri Foundation fellowship.

== Works ==
=== Poetry collections ===
- The Devil's Garden. Alice James Books. 2003. ISBN 9781882295418.
- Mixology. Penguin Books. 2009. ISBN 9780143115830.
- The Big Smoke. Penguin Books. 2013. ISBN 9780143123729.
- Map to the Stars. Penguin Books. 2017. ISBN 9780143130574.
- Somebody Else Sold the World. Penguin Books. 2021. ISBN 9780143136446.
- Be Easy: New and Selected Poems. Liveright. 2026. ISBN 9781324097501.

=== Graphic nonfiction ===
- Last on His Feet: Jack Johnson and the Battle of the Century, with Youssef Daoudi. Liveright. 2023. ISBN 9781631495588.

=== Anthology contributions ===
- "Understanding Al Green", in Toi Derricotte, Cornelius Eady and Camille T. Dungy, eds., Gathering Ground: A Reader Celebrating Cave Canem's First Decade. University of Michigan Press. 2006. ISBN 9780472069248.
