= E. A. Richardson =

American poet

- Born: Emory Aaron Richardson; April 30, 1886; Clay Township, Pike County, Indiana
- Died: September 17, 1965 (aged 79)
- Occupations: Poet, songwriter
- Writing career
- Pen name: "Big Rich"

Signature
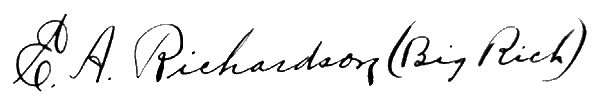

Emory Aaron "Big Rich" Richardson (April 30, 1886 – September 17, 1965) was an American poet. He was the first person to be unofficially designated state poet laureate of Indiana. The Indiana State Poet Laureate position was not made official until July 1, 2005. Much of his poetry was written about his native Indiana, especially Hoosier nature and country life.

== Life ==
Emory Aaron Richardson was born on a farm in Clay Township, Pike County, Indiana. He began writing poetry in 1910. The first poem to establish him as a poet was his famous My Alligator Grin.

Richardson addressed the Indiana General Assembly on February 12, 1929, Abraham Lincoln's Birthday, where he read his poem Lincoln, the Hoosier and was voted state poet laureate by the legislature. Richardson's state poet laureate honor was reaffirmed in 1965 after his death.

When Richardson would be asked for his autograph he would often sign it with the addition of a couplet of his favorite original motto: "Let's trade grins, Then be frien's."

During his life he published eight books of poems, most popular being Indiana and Other Poems, Hoosier Holly-Hocks, and Turkey Run and Selected Poems.

== Selected works ==
=== Poems ===
- A-Beggin' Ma
- A Choice River
- A Deaf and Dumb Dance
- A Good Turn vs. A Fast One
- A Sad Circumstance
- Alpine Flowers
- Another Notch
- Boost Our Town
- The Boy Scouts
- The Builders
- Byers
- The Cardinal
- Cured O' Braggin'
- Dying At Home
- Eva
- The Exit of the Gourd
- Friendship
- Four-Line Philosophy
- Honored
- Indiana
- Indiana Authors
- Indiana's President
- In My Library
- Lincoln, the Hoosier
- Lincoln's Mother
- Luck Alone Won't Win
- Mutual Laughter
- My Alligator Grin
- The Oak
- Ol' Leiter's Ford
- Old New Harmony
- One Year
- Pawpaws
- Persimmons
- Petunias
- The Poets
- The Question
- The Remedy
- Retrospection
- Rev'rence for Law
- Roadside Beauties
- Sassafras Fence Posts
- Sassafras Tea
- The "School Marm"
- Shifts
- Thanksgiving Dinner
- Toddy Waddy
- Too Tickled
- The Torch Bearers
- Turkey Run
- Union
- The Wabash Bottoms
- We Clowns
- Well Done

=== Poetry collections ===
- Indiana and Other Poems
- Hoosier Holly-Hocks
- Turkey Run and Selected Poems

=== Songs ===
- We'll Have Fun

== See also ==
- Indiana State Poet Laureate
