= Taxation in Massachusetts =

Taxation in the U.S. state of Massachusetts

Massachusetts has four types of taxes: individual taxes, business taxes, sales taxes, and property taxes.

== Tax reductions in Massachusetts ==
Massachusetts allows for tax reductions based upon different factors.

=== Forestry, agriculture, and recreation ===
Chapter 61 is a voluntary current use program designed by the Massachusetts Legislature to tax real property in the Commonwealth of Massachusetts at its resource value rather than its highest and best use (development) value. Landowners who enroll their land in the program receive property tax reductions in exchange for a lien on their property.

There are three types of Chapter 61 programs:

- Chapter 61: Forest Lands and Forest Products
- Chapter 61A: Agricultural and Horticultural Land
- Chapter 61B: Recreational Land

==== Chapter 61: Forest Lands and Forest Products ====
Under Chapter 61, in order to qualify for the Chapter 61 program, a parcel of real property must be at least 10 acres (40,000 m^{2}) contiguous and under the same ownership. Prior to approval, the landowner must establish a forest management plan for the affected property and have it approved by a state-certified forester. Only the wooded and undeveloped portions of the land may be enrolled in the program. The tax reduction is based upon the market value of the potential forestry products the land can produce.

==== Chapter 61A: Agricultural and Horticultural Land ====
Under 61A, the property for agricultural use must be at least 5 acres, and the reduction in tax is based on the market value of farm products the land can support. The land may also be used for forestland, but if so, the landowner must produce a 10-year forest management plan.

==== Chapter 61B: Recreational Land ====
Under 61B, the property for open space and recreation must be at least 5 acres. The tax reduction is 75% of its assessed value, and working with forest management is optional. The land must be "available to the general public or to members of a non-profit organization, including a corporation organized under chapter one hundred and eighty."

== History of Chapter 61 ==
Chapter 61 was passed by the MA General Legislature on Nov. 7, 1978 and it was amended in 2006.

== Right of first refusal ==
Chapter 61B grants municipalities a right of first refusal on land that is classified as recreational, thereby allowing municipalities to purchase the land before it's sold or converted to a non-recreational use.

In 2017, when the Allendale Country Club in the Town of North Dartmouth, MA wanted to sell, the town, with the Right of First Refusal, purchased the land assessed $5.8 million, for $3.2 million. The golf course was retained as a country club under the same name but open to the public, at more affordable rates.

In 2022, the town of Tisbury, MA refused to purchase a portion of land that the Mink Meadows Golf Club, a 61B club, had decided to sell. A buyer was found for the parcel and the funds from the sale was used to replace the club's irrigation system and to do environmental work to improve their saltwater ponds and freshwater ponds.

== Assessment method for taxation of golf courses ==
In Chapter 61 Section 2, Massachusetts designates golf courses as eligible for current use assessment as a type of open space or recreational land use. Under Section 38, it is assessed as commercial property.

== Controversy surrounding 61B ==
=== Belmont, MA ===
The Town of Belmont turned its attention to Belmont Country Club, tax-exempt since 1945, and whose initiation fee is $95,000. per member and which received close to $4 million in tax breaks in the last ten years. On November 13, 2023, the Town of Belmont held a town hall meeting which approved a citizen-brought motion by a vote of 229-3, with one abstention, to end the 61B exclusion for the Belmont Country Club. The citizens, taxpayers, were dissatisfied that the Belmont Country Club had received more than $4 million in tax breaks in the past ten years due to Chapter 61B provisions.

The Home Rule Petition seeking to exclude the town of Belmont from the provisions of 61B, was filed in the 194th session (2025) as Bill HD.1618, a bill entitled "An Act updating the tax treatment of recreational lands in the town of Belmont." The bill is co-sponsored by Rep. Brownsberger and Rep. Rogers. On July 15, 2025, a hearing with the Joint Committee on Revenue was held, that committee extending its reporting date to Friday, June 26, 2026.

=== Swampscott, MA ===
The Town of Swampscott held a special town hall meeting on Monday, March 11, 2024, to vote on authorizing the town's Select Board to exempt the town from the requirements of 61B. The vote was in favor of exempting the Tedesco Country Club from the provisions of 61B, a discussion that was led by Town Administrator Sean Fitzgerald. A Home Rule Petition seeking to exclude the town of Swampscott from the provisions of 61B was filed in the 194th Session (2025) as Bill H.3917, a bill entitled "An Act updating the tax treatment of recreational lands in the town of Swampscott." The bill was co-sponsored by Rep. Balinsky Armini and Rep. Crighton. On October 22, 2025, the Joint Committee on Revenue reported the bill favorably and referred it to the committee on House Steering, Policy and Scheduling." Sean Fitzgerald, Swampscott's administrator, stated "“Every citizen, every property tax payer in Swampscott is actually gifting the Tedesco Country Club $133,000 so they can enjoy a very exclusive club... From a public policy standpoint, this is unjust and wrong.”

=== Newton, MA ===
Attention in Newton, MA, is being turned to its three golf courses, the Brae Burn Country Club, Woodland Golf Club, and Charles River Club of Auburndale. Newton former City Councilor Vicky Danberg has stated, "I can tell you very few people have sympathy for the poor golfers from these clubs who are crying poverty." Former president of Newton's firefighters' union Frannie Capello said Newton's country clubs will often open up their courses once a year to the city's firefighters. While firefighters much appreciate that, he said, he didn't think it was worth the revenue lost to the city, citing the City 's struggle to find ways to pay for much needed repair of fire stations. Responded one reader, “No one is asking them to fold, and given the wealth of the members, that will never happen. All anyone is asking is that they pay their fair share, just like small local businesses and residents do.” Newton's former Mayor Ruthann Fuller stated, "The level of abatement that state law currently allows deserves a second look."

=== Bellingham, Massachusetts ===
In Bellingham, MA, on January 2026, Maplegate Golf Course, a 140-acre 18-hole public golf course taxed under 61B, was sold for under $25.million to a private developer who plans to turn the land into a solar field. It is expected that the end of the 61B tax incentive will bring Franklin an additional $280,000 annually in tax revenue.

=== Arlington, MA ===
In Arlington, MA, on March 9, 2026, a citizen petition to exempt the town from Chapter 61B tax classifications for private country clubs was presented to the Finance Committee, who declined to take a position on it. On May 3, 2026, debate over the 61B tax breaks for town's two golf clubs, Belmont Country Club, which had requested the tax breaks, and Winchester Country Club, which had not, took place; the debate ended with Arlington's Select Board voting 3-1 to recommend favorable action, with one dissension and one recusal.

=== Other Towns ===
==== Wellesley ====
In a guest column, the Wellesley Country Club in Wellesley was criticized in 2011 for its embrace of the 61B tax subsidy.

==== Framingham, Marlborough, Needham ====
Massachusetts country clubs taking advantage of the 61B tax are also in Framingham and Marlborough, such as the Marlborough Country Club. A private golf course, Marlborough Country Club is, however, open to the public on Mondays and Tuesdays. The tax-exempt Sankaty Head Golf Club Inc. is open to the public during its off-season, from October to May. A private golf course in Needham, the Needham Golf Club, has 61B status for the golf course acreage and has also designated "Residents’ Days” for Needham residents who are not members of the club. It also supports the community with its non-profit Needham Golf Club Charities (NGCC) by providing funding to various Needham-based community and charitable organizations.

==== Plymouth ====
In Plymouth, MA, in 2025, the McSharry family, owners of the Atlantic Country Club, a 61B golf club, signed a purchase and sale agreement with Ben Virga, a Duxbury private developer, which was then held up by the town Select Board with evidence that the sale was not a bona fide offer, as the offer for the portion designated as recreational space, which the town has Right of First Refusal under 61B, far exceeded the value of the parcel. The buyers subsequently, in April 2025, withdrew their offer. The following month, two subsequent offers were made: one an offer of $19 million for the recreational 61B land, and another bid for two other parcels. Plymouth's council argued that any offer must be tied to the current 61B assessed value, and not a future value. The McSharrys, over the past five years alone, received more than $120,000 in property tax breaks, according to town officials. Subsequently the owners took the golf course out of 61B recreational land status, which also entailed their paying back taxes at the full rate. In September 2025, the State of MA placed Plymouth under the two-year MA Comprehensive Permit Law, often called safe harbor status.

==== Brookline, Watertown ====
Not all Massachusetts golf clubs ask for the tax break. The Country Club, in Brookline, with two golf courses, does not. The Oakley Country Club, an 88-acre golf club in Watertown, pays its full tax bill.

== Sustainability, 61B, and Golf Courses ==
Some have questioned whether golf courses promote the benefits to the environment of land "retained in substantially a natural, wild, or open condition or in a landscaped or pasture condition or in a managed forest condition under a certified forest management plan approved by and subject to procedures established by the state forester in such a manner as to allow to a significant extent the preservation of wildlife and other natural resources, including but not limited to, ground or surface water resources, clean air, vegetation, rare or endangered species, geologic features, high quality soils, and scenic resources" that the 61B law intended to protect.

Audubon International, for example, has developed an Audubon Cooperative Sanctuary Program for Golf Courses (ACSP), which provides guidance on six key environmental components:
• Site Assessment/Environmental Planning.
• Wildlife and Habitat Management.
• Chemical Use Reduction and Safety.
• Water Conservation.
• Water Quality Management.
• Outreach and Education.

MassGolf, a 501(c)3 organization formed in 2018 and one of the largest state golf associations in the United States, promotes the ACSP program; 14 golf courses in Massachusetts have received this certification and are abiding by its guidelines. MassGolf also has a "Monarchs in the Rough" program which numerous public and private golf courses in Massachusetts and elsewhere have completed and received certification.

The program and certification is also endorsed by the United States Golf Association (USGA), which itself has its own program to promote sustainability that deals with topics such as a written environmental management plan, a proactive maintenance facility that minimizes risks to the environment, maintaining water quality that is good for wildlife and the environment that includes a vegetated buffer around water features that provide habitat for wildlife, and undertaking a tree inventory assessment.
