= Massachusetts Medal of Liberty =

The Massachusetts Medal of Liberty is awarded to Massachusetts service men and women who have been killed in action or who died as a result of wounds received in action. It is bequeathed on behalf of the Governor of the Commonwealth of Massachusetts as Commander-in-Chief of the Commonwealth. The medal was designed by Sgt. Kristopher W. Adams.

== Description ==
The medal is heart-shaped to symbolize the Purple Heart and is attached to a 1 3/8 inch wide ribbon with a black border representing mourning.

The centre of the medal bears a Gold Star symbolizing Gold Star Mothers Club.

At the top centre of the medal is the coat of arms of the Commonwealth of Massachusetts and on the rear side is the service member's branch of service with a blank space to have the honored service member's name engraved by recipient and the words “In Honored Memory” engraved above and “Service and Sacrifice” below.
