= Indiana State Poet Laureate =

Poet laureate of Indiana

The Indiana state poet laureate is the poet laureate for the U.S. state of Indiana. Senate Enrolled Act No. 433 created the position effective July 1, 2005, but Indiana had a well-established unofficial position of state poet laureate since 1929. Laureates serve a two-year term. The selection of Indiana state poet laureate is made by the Indiana Arts Commission executive director and seven members chosen by the commission who represent institutions of higher education.

== Current Indiana state poet laureate ==
- Curtis L. Crisler (January 25, 2024 – Present)

== Previous official laureates ==
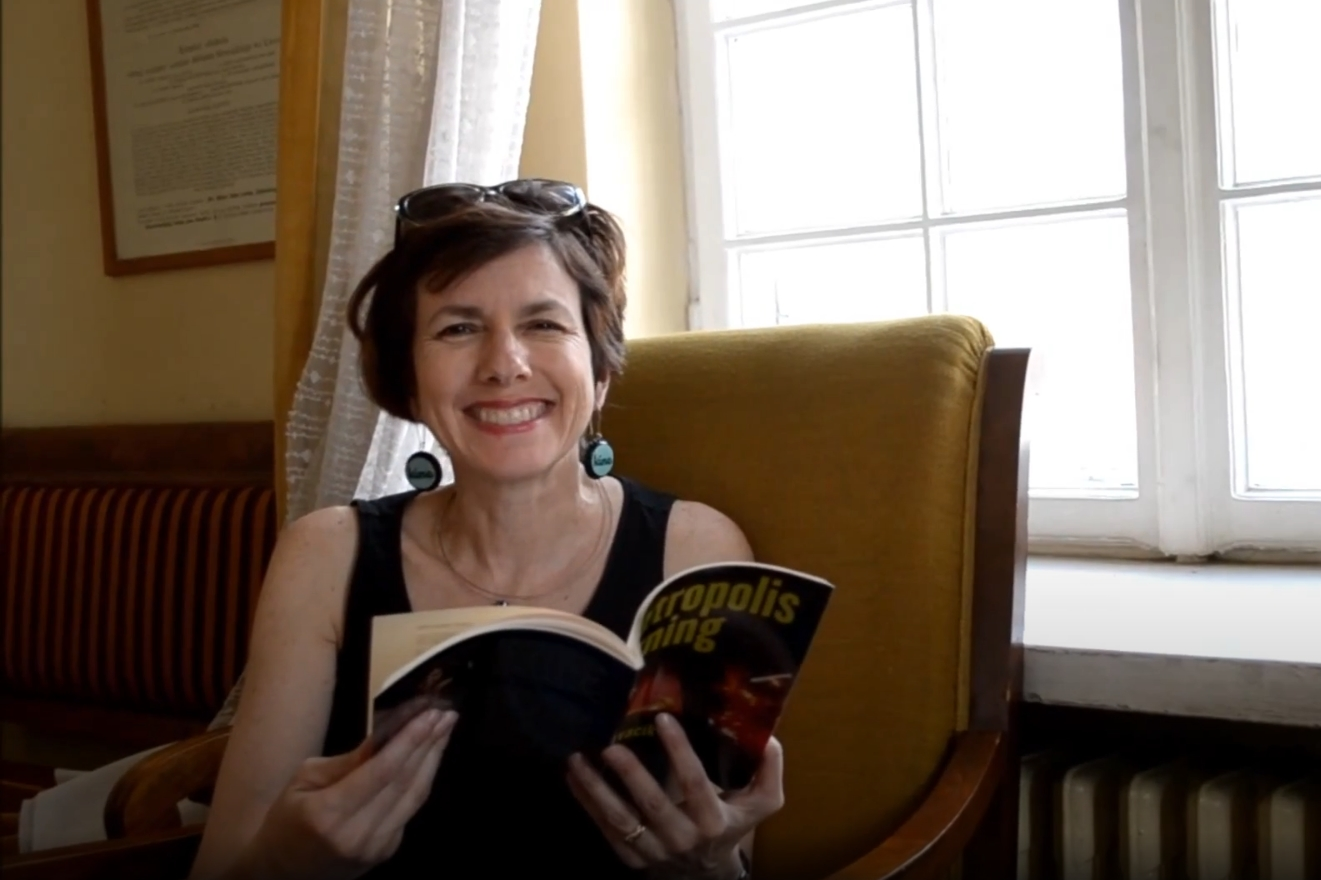
Karen Kovacik was poet laureate in 2012.

- Matthew Graham (January 1, 2020 – 2023)
- Adrian Matejka (January 1, 2018 – December 31, 2019)
- Shari Wagner (January 1, 2016 – December 31, 2017)
- George Kalamaras (January 1, 2014 – December 31, 2015)
- Karen Kovacik (January 1, 2012 – December 31, 2013)
- Norbert Krapf (June 17, 2008 – 2010)
- Joyce Brinkman (July 1, 2005 – June 2008)

== Previous unofficial laureates ==
- Emory Aaron Richardson (named 1929 by motion of the General Assembly)
- Mary Hagler LeMaster (1945)
- Florence Marie Taylor (1946)
- William Chitwood (1947)
- Effie Lydia Fisher (1948)
- Mina Morris Scott (1949)
- Ollah Eloise Toph (1950)
- Alma C. Mahan (1951)
- Mable Newman (1952)
- Myrl G. New (1953)
- Thelma Howell Porter (1954)
- Nellie Baldwin Rudser (1955)
- Samuel S. Biddle (1956)
- Gwen Robert Boyer (1957)
- Jeannette Vaughn Konley (1958)
- Clarence O. Adams (1959)
- Carl Stader (1960–1961)
- Mildred Musgrave (1962)
- Mable Skeen (1963)
- Lloyd Whitehead (1964)
- Glen Galbraith (1965)
- Frances Brown Price (1966)
- Elsie Startzman (1967)
- Mildred Musgrave Shartle (1968)
- Paul Startzman (1969)
- Dr. Earl Marlott (1970)
- Marjorie Sea Fortmeyer (1971)
- Mary Simmons (1972)
- Florence Helen McGaughey (1973)
- Frances Brown Price (1974)
- Georgia Ellis (1975)
- Laverne Hanson Brown (1976–1977)
- Arthur Franklin Mapes (named 1977 by House Concurrent Resolution 63)
- Glenna Glee Jenkins (1979–1980)
- Vivian Pierson Ramsey (1981–1982)
- Esther Alman (1983–1984)
- Kay (Kinnaman) Sims (1985–1986)
- Dena Adams (1987–1988)
- Paula Fehn (1989–1990)
- Dr. J.C.Bacala (1991–1992)
- Jeanne Losey (1993–1997)
- Esther Towns (1998–2000)
- Glenna Glee Jenkins (2001–2003)
- Carol Ogdon Floyd (2004 – October 2007)

== See also ==
- Poet laureate
- List of U.S. state poets laureate
- United States Poet Laureate
