= Massachusetts Promise Fellowship =

Massachusetts Promise Fellowship (MPF) is a non-profit AmeriCorps organization that places Fellows who commit to a year of service at non-profit organizations, schools, and city agencies across Massachusetts to create, lead, and manage youth development projects.

== Mission ==
The Massachusetts Promise Fellowship provides leadership training to young adults who commit to one year of service to the State's Commonwealth.

== The 5 Promises ==
Massachusetts Promise Fellows work to deliver the 5 Promises to youth and their communities. These are well-defined objectives developed in partnership with host sites and funders. All Fellow projects align with at least one of these five promises:

Marketable Skills: Fellows will work closely with and support emerging youth leaders as the young people develop and implement a variety of activities, programs, and projects that benefit their community.

Caring Adult: Fellows will develop new mentoring programs and expand upon current mentoring programs in an effort to establish and support new mentor/mentee matches.

Safe Place: Fellows will develop and lead out-of-school enrichment activities (i.e., adventure programming, service-learning projects, tutoring, athletics) for young people.

Healthy Start: Fellows will coordinate and lead education and outreach efforts (i.e., newsletters, web sites, seminars, summits, workshops, dances) to inform and educate young people on a variety of issues and topics (i.e., sex education, health care access, nutrition, substance abuse prevention, diversity awareness, conflict resolution, HIV/AIDS, legal rights, mental health).

Opportunity to Serve: Fellows will actively recruit, train, and manage volunteers that will serve to support their project and the mission of their host organization.
