= Curtis L. Crisler =

- Born: Gary, Indiana, U.S.
- Education: Indiana University–Purdue University Fort Wayne (BA), Southern Illinois University Carbondale, (MFA)
- Occupations: Poet, educator
- Writing career
- Language: English
- Genres: Poetry, Young adult literature
- Website: www.poetcrisler.com

Curtis L. Crisler (born 1965) is an American poet and educator from Gary, Indiana. He is the current Indiana State Poet Laureate and a professor of English at Purdue University Fort Wayne.

He is a Cave Canem fellow and the recipient of the 2022 C&R Press Award for Poetry for his book, Doing Drive-Bys on How to Love in the Midwest. Crisler is the creator of the sonastic poetry form.

== Early life and education ==
Crisler was born and raised in Gary, Indiana.

He earned a Bachelor of Arts in English, with a minor in theatre, from Indiana University–Purdue University Fort Wayne (now Purdue University Fort Wayne), and a Master of Fine Arts from Southern Illinois University Carbondale.

== Writing ==
Crisler's literary work includes poetry, young adult fiction, and chapbooks. His publications have received national awards and nominations.

Crisler has described his work as an "urban Midwestern sensibility" (uMS), "the community and creativity of the varied relationships of descendants from the first through second waves of the southern migration, exploring their connections to place/environment, history, family, and self."

=== Selected works ===
Title	Type	Notes
Doing Drive-Bys on How to Love in the Midwest	Poetry collection	Winner of the 2022 C&R Press Award for Poetry
Indiana Nocturnes: Our Rural and Urban Patchwork	Poetry collection	Co-authored with Kevin McKelvey
THe GReY aLBuM [PoeMS]	Poetry collection	Winner of a Steel Toe Books Open Reading Period Prize
Don’t Moan So Much (Stevie): A Poetry Musiquarium	Poetry collection	—
Pulling Scabs	Poetry collection	Nominated for a Pushcart Prize
Tough Boy Sonatas	Poetry collection	Nominated for the Eliot Rosewater Award (2009)
’This’ Ameri-can-ah	Poetry collection	Eric Hoffer Award nominee
Black Achilles	Chapbook	Eric Hoffer Award nominee
Soundtrack to Latchkey Boy	Chapbook	—
Spill	Chapbook	Winner of the 2008 Keyhole Chapbook Award
Wonderkind	Chapbook	Nominated for a Pushcart Prize
Burnt Offering of a City	Chapbook	Winner of the Kathy Young Chapbook Award

=== Fellowships and residencies ===
- City of Asylum
- Soul Mountain Retreat
- Cave Canem Foundation
- Hamline University

=== Awards and grants ===
- RHINO Founder's Prize (2021), for Fifty Something Years of Letters Laters
- The Sterling Plumpp First Voices Poetry Award
- Jessie Redmon Fauset Book Award (nominated)

=== Literary journals ===
Crisler's writing has appeared in literary journals including African American Review, Crab Orchard Review, and Belt Magazine.

=== Poetic form ===
Crisler is the creator of the sonastic, a poetic form he describes as combining elements of ekphrastic poetry and persona poetry. He is also the creator of the Indiana Chitlin Circuit, a Fort Wayne-based writing circuit.

=== Indiana State Poet Laureate ===
Crisler was named Indiana's eighth official poet laureate in January 2024 by unanimous decision. He succeeded George Kalamaras.

As poet laureate, he has conducted statewide outreach through readings, workshops, and educational programs and has participated in the Indiana Authors Awards Speaker Program.
