= Massachusetts statistical areas =

Coordinates: 42.2596°N 71.8083°W

The United States Commonwealth of Massachusetts currently has 12 statistical areas that have been delineated by the Office of Management and Budget (OMB). On July 21, 2023, the OMB delineated two combined statistical area, seven metropolitan statistical areas, and three micropolitan statistical area in Massachusetts. As of 2023, the largest of these is the Boston-Worcester-Providence, MA-RI-NH CSA, comprising the area around Massachusetts' capital and largest city of Boston.

== Statistical areas ==
The Office of Management and Budget (OMB) has designated more than 1,000 statistical areas for the United States and Puerto Rico. These statistical areas are important geographic delineations of population clusters used by the OMB, the United States Census Bureau, planning organizations, and federal, state, and local government entities.

The OMB defines a core-based statistical area (CBSA) as the county or counties (or county-equivalents) surrounding at least one densely-settled core of at least 10,000 population, "plus adjacent counties having a high degree of social and economic integration with the core as measured through commuting ties with the counties containing the core". The OMB further divides a CBSA based on population into a metropolitan statistical area (MSA) for those with at least 50,000 people or a micropolitan statistical area (μSA) for those with 10,000 to 49,999 people.

The OMB defines a combined statistical area (CSA) as two or more adjacent CBSAs where the employment interchange rate (percent commuting from A to B plus percent commuting from B to A) is at least 15%. A primary statistical area (PSA) includes all CSAs and any CBSA that is not a constituent of a combined statistical area.

The 12 United States statistical areas and 14 counties of the Commonwealth of Massachusetts (Note: An out-of-state area and its population are displayed in green. An area that extends into more than one state is displayed in purple. A purple population number over a black population number show the total population versus the in-state population. The state's abbreviation is also shown next to the in-state total.)
Combined statistical area	2025 population (est.)	Core-based statistical area	2025 population (est.)	County	2025 population (est.)	Metropolitan division	2025 population (est.)
Boston-Worcester-Providence, MA-RI-NH CSA	8,521,063; 6,290,782 (MA)	Boston-Cambridge-Newton, MA-NH MSA	5,034,221; 4,575,101 (MA)	Middlesex County, Massachusetts	1,669,979	Cambridge-Newton-Framingham, MA MD	2,496,632
Boston-Worcester-Providence, MA-RI-NH CSA	8,521,063; 6,290,782 (MA)	Boston-Cambridge-Newton, MA-NH MSA	5,034,221; 4,575,101 (MA)	Essex County, Massachusetts	826,653	Cambridge-Newton-Framingham, MA MD	2,496,632
Boston-Worcester-Providence, MA-RI-NH CSA	8,521,063; 6,290,782 (MA)	Boston-Cambridge-Newton, MA-NH MSA	5,034,221; 4,575,101 (MA)	Suffolk County, Massachusetts	791,891	Boston, MA MD	2,078,469
Boston-Worcester-Providence, MA-RI-NH CSA	8,521,063; 6,290,782 (MA)	Boston-Cambridge-Newton, MA-NH MSA	5,034,221; 4,575,101 (MA)	Norfolk County, Massachusetts	739,749	Boston, MA MD	2,078,469
Boston-Worcester-Providence, MA-RI-NH CSA	8,521,063; 6,290,782 (MA)	Boston-Cambridge-Newton, MA-NH MSA	5,034,221; 4,575,101 (MA)	Plymouth County, Massachusetts	546,829	Boston, MA MD	2,078,469
Boston-Worcester-Providence, MA-RI-NH CSA	8,521,063; 6,290,782 (MA)	Boston-Cambridge-Newton, MA-NH MSA	5,034,221; 4,575,101 (MA)	Rockingham County, New Hampshire	324,077	Rockingham County-Strafford County, NH MD	459,120
Boston-Worcester-Providence, MA-RI-NH CSA	8,521,063; 6,290,782 (MA)	Boston-Cambridge-Newton, MA-NH MSA	5,034,221; 4,575,101 (MA)	Strafford County, New Hampshire	135,043	Rockingham County-Strafford County, NH MD	459,120
Boston-Worcester-Providence, MA-RI-NH CSA	8,521,063; 6,290,782 (MA)	Providence-Warwick, RI-MA MSA	1,708,161; 593,640 (MA)	Providence County, Rhode Island	678,179	none	
Boston-Worcester-Providence, MA-RI-NH CSA	8,521,063; 6,290,782 (MA)	Providence-Warwick, RI-MA MSA	1,708,161; 593,640 (MA)	Bristol County, Massachusetts	593,640	none	
Boston-Worcester-Providence, MA-RI-NH CSA	8,521,063; 6,290,782 (MA)	Providence-Warwick, RI-MA MSA	1,708,161; 593,640 (MA)	Kent County, Rhode Island	173,495	none	
Boston-Worcester-Providence, MA-RI-NH CSA	8,521,063; 6,290,782 (MA)	Providence-Warwick, RI-MA MSA	1,708,161; 593,640 (MA)	Washington County, Rhode Island	129,795	none	
Boston-Worcester-Providence, MA-RI-NH CSA	8,521,063; 6,290,782 (MA)	Providence-Warwick, RI-MA MSA	1,708,161; 593,640 (MA)	Newport County, Rhode Island	83,051	none	
Boston-Worcester-Providence, MA-RI-NH CSA	8,521,063; 6,290,782 (MA)	Providence-Warwick, RI-MA MSA	1,708,161; 593,640 (MA)	Bristol County, Rhode Island	50,001	none	
Boston-Worcester-Providence, MA-RI-NH CSA	8,521,063; 6,290,782 (MA)	Worcester, MA MSA	888,502	Worcester County, Massachusetts	888,502	none	
Boston-Worcester-Providence, MA-RI-NH CSA	8,521,063; 6,290,782 (MA)	Manchester-Nashua, NH MSA	433,415	Hillsborough County, New Hampshire	433,415	none	
Boston-Worcester-Providence, MA-RI-NH CSA	8,521,063; 6,290,782 (MA)	Barnstable Town, MA MSA	233,539	Barnstable County, Massachusetts	233,539	none	
Boston-Worcester-Providence, MA-RI-NH CSA	8,521,063; 6,290,782 (MA)	Concord, NH μSA	158,078	Merrimack County, New Hampshire	158,078	none	
Boston-Worcester-Providence, MA-RI-NH CSA	8,521,063; 6,290,782 (MA)	Laconia, NH μSA	65,147	Belknap County, New Hampshire	65,147	none	
Springfield-Amherst Town-Northampton, MA CSA	699,101	Springfield, MA MSA	464,338	Hampden County, Massachusetts	464,338	none	
Springfield-Amherst Town-Northampton, MA CSA	699,101	Amherst Town-Northampton, MA MSA	164,065	Hampshire County, Massachusetts	164,065	none	
Springfield-Amherst Town-Northampton, MA CSA	699,101	Greenfield, MA μSA	70,698	Franklin County, Massachusetts	70,698	none	
none		Pittsfield, MA MSA	128,224	Berkshire County, Massachusetts	128,224	none	
none		Vineyard Haven, MA μSA	21,219	Dukes County, Massachusetts	21,219	none	
none		Nantucket, MA μSA	14,758	Nantucket County, Massachusetts	14,758	none	
Commonwealth of Massachusetts					7,154,084	none	

The 10 core-based statistical areas of the Commonwealth of Massachusetts (Note: For CBSAs comprising populations from multiple states, they are listed twice to show both their intrastate population within that CBSA as well as the CBSA's total population. Only the intrastate population is ranked.)
2025 rank	Core-based statistical area	Population				
2025 rank	Core-based statistical area	2025 estimate	Change	2020 Census	Change	2010 Census
1	Boston-Cambridge-Newton, MA-NH MSA (MA)	4,575,101	+1.75%	4,496,567	+8.77%	4,134,036
2	Worcester, MA MSA	888,502	+3.06%	862,111	+7.96%	798,552
3	Providence-Warwick, RI-MA MSA (MA)	593,640	+2.49%	579,200	+5.64%	548,285
4	Springfield, MA MSA	464,338	−0.32%	465,825	+0.50%	463,490
5	Barnstable Town, MA MSA	233,539	+1.98%	228,996	+6.07%	215,888
6	Amherst Town-Northampton, MA MSA	164,065	+1.08%	162,308	+2.67%	158,080
7	Pittsfield, MA MSA	128,224	−0.62%	129,026	−1.67%	131,219
8	Greenfield, MA μSA	70,698	−0.47%	71,029	−0.48%	71,372
9	Vineyard Haven, MA μSA	21,219	+3.00%	20,600	+24.58%	16,535
10	Nantucket, MA μSA	14,758	+3.53%	14,255	+40.14%	10,172
	Boston-Cambridge-Newton, MA-NH MSA	5,034,221	+1.87%	4,941,632	+8.55%	4,552,402
	Providence-Warwick, RI-MA MSA	1,708,161	+1.88%	1,676,579	+4.73%	1,600,852

The two combined statistical areas of the Commonwealth of Massachusetts (Note: For CSAs comprising populations from multiple states, they are listed twice to show both their intrastate population within that CSA as well as the CSA's total population. Only the intrastate population is ranked.)
2025 rank	Combined statistical area	Population				
2025 rank	Combined statistical area	2025 estimate	Change	2020 Census	Change	2010 Census
1	Boston-Worcester-Providence, MA-RI-NH CSA (MA)	6,290,782	+2.01%	6,166,874	+8.25%	5,696,761
2	Springfield-Amherst Town-Northampton, MA CSA	699,101	−0.01%	699,162	+0.90%	692,942
	Boston-Worcester-Providence, MA-RI-NH CSA	8,521,063	+2.05%	8,349,768	+7.39%	7,774,948

== See also ==
- Geography of Massachusetts
  - Demographics of Massachusetts
