= Massachusetts (Because of You Our Land is Free) =

Official patriotic song of Massachusetts

"Massachusetts (Because of You Our Land is Free)," words and music by Bernard Davidson, was made the official patriotic song of Massachusetts on October 23, 1989.
