= List of U.S. state poems =

This is the list of poems in the U.S. states.

State	State poem	Citation/Year
Florida	"I am Florida" by Allen Autry Sr.	2010
Indiana	"Indiana" by Arthur Franklin Mapes	1963
Kentucky	"My Old Kentucky Home" by Stephen C. Foster	
Louisiana	"America, We The People" by Sylvia Davidson Lott Buckley (State judicial poem)	1995
Louisiana	"Leadership" by Jean McGivney Boese (State Senate poem)	1999
Louisiana	"I Am Louisiana" by Paul Ott (State cultural poem)	2006
Massachusetts	"Blue Hills of Massachusetts" by Katherine E. Mullen	1981
New Mexico	"A Nuevo México" by Luis Tafoya	1991
North Carolina	"The Tar Heel Toast" by Leonora Martin and Mary Burke Kerr (State toast)	1957
Oklahoma	"Howdy Folks: The Official Will Rogers Poem" by David Randolph Milsten	1941
Tennessee	"Oh Tennessee, My Tennessee" by Admiral William Lawrence	1973
Tennessee	"Who We Are" by Margaret Britton Vaughn (State bicentennial poem)	1997
Tennessee	"Home to Stay" by Jasper N. Bailey (State veterans' poem)	2014
Tennessee	"I Am Tennessee" by Major Hooper Penuel (State declamation)	1987
Texas	"Legend of Old Stone Ranch" by John Worth Cloud (State epic poem)	1969

== See also ==
- Lists of U.S. state insignia
