= Massachusetts Corporation for Educational Telecommunications =

The Massachusetts Corporation for Educational Telecommunications (MCET) is a quasi-public agency created by an act of the Massachusetts legislature in 1982 to "establish and operate a statewide communications network to meet the educational and informational needs of business, industry, government, and the inhabitants of the commonwealth." As of 1996, MCET had an annual budget of ~$9 million and its distance-learning content reached 1.3 million participants across 47 states and in every school district in Massachusetts. Its offices were located at One Kendall Square building 1500 (at the corner of Cardinal Medeiros Ave and Binney St in front of Kendall Square Cinema) in Cambridge, Massachusetts.

The corporation oversaw Massachusetts Educational Television (MET), a program that had been launched in the 1970s and which was originally managed by the Massachusetts Executive Committee for Educational Television. MET produced and broadcast original educational programming, as well as purchasing rights to educational programming from third parties for broadcast in Massachusetts. MET programming was broadcast via PBS affiliates WGBH-TV channel 2 in Boston and WGBY-TV channel 57 in Springfield. Some programming was also directly broadcast via satellite to schools around the commonwealth. Program guides for MET are held on microfilm by the State Library of Massachusetts.

MCET created "Mass LearnPike", a satellite-based network funded in part by a Star Schools grant to "explore the use of distance-learning in K–12 schools." The LearnPike used semi-interactive video, consisting of a 1-way video broadcast and a 2-way audio channel to deliver educational content. Mass LearnPike program listings were made available on the MCET web site beginning in 1997.

In 1993, MCET was tasked by the Massachusetts Education Reform Act of 1993 with leading the implementation of Mass Ed OnLine, to provide a statewide client-server network with full access to the internet. Through this program, MCET acted as a low-cost Internet service provider to school districts as well as providing home access to K–12 teachers in Massachusetts.

The web site URL for MCET was https://web.archive.org/web/19970128033035/http://www.mcet.edu/ and existed as early as 1996, according to the copyright notice on the page archived in July 1997. Beginning in autumn 2000, a rebranding from MCET to "Mass Interaction" occurred, and the mcet.edu site was redirected to massinteraction.org beginning sometime between October 18 and November 10, 2000.

MCET ceased operations due to cash-flow problems in October 2001 after its funding in the proposed Massachusetts FY02 budget was severely reduced (from $3.7m to $700k), but before the final budget was approved (October 2001 was 4 months into FY02). At the time of its closure.
