= Massachusetts Consumers' Coalition =

The Massachusetts Consumers' Coalition is the primary consumer rights advocacy organization in Massachusetts. The organization is structured as a non-profit (501(c)(3)), and serves as the primary umbrella organization for organizations working in Massachusetts with consumer rights concerns. The organization works on federal and state-level consumer laws and provides consumer education on credit, insurance, sales, media control, and other consumer issues, and was instrumental in passing Massachusetts' lemon law in the 1970s, one of the first state-level lemon laws.

Significant initiatives worked on:

- Car purchase rules, including car lemon laws, defeat of the "as is" car bill, enactment of a used car warranty law; MCC is well known for its "Car Smart" guideline, periodically revised, which includes information about Massachusetts-specific rules for buying, leasing, and repairing cars
- Consumer privacy - Financial transactions (including credit card), RFID, data aggregators, and other issues
- Credit reporting reform
- Telecommunications and media diversity issues including opposition to cable television ownership transfers without guarantees of net neutrality, and opposition to the 2003 Federal Communications Commission proposal to permit greater consolidation of mass media ownership, opposition to higher cable rates
- Utility rates and promoting energy efficiency
- Home ownership and home financing - Home safety including passage of law regulating sale of home water treatment devices; home ownership financing rules
- Gun control, primarily working with the Consumer Federation of America
