= Ode to Massachusetts =

Official ode of Massachusetts since 2000

- Official ode of Massachusetts
- Lyrics: Joseph Falzone
- Music: Joseph Falzone
- Adopted: November 22, 2000

"Ode to Massachusetts" is a song honoring the history and geography of Massachusetts, United States, written by Joseph Falzone. It was adopted as the official ode of the state on November 22, 2000.

== Inspiration ==
Joseph Falzone of Boston was a World War II veteran, a retiree from Suffolk Downs, and well-known in his local area as a one-man band who played in local parades. He thought that Massachusetts needed an official song that recognized its history and geography. He had previously written a song honoring Los Angeles based on his time living there. He wrote "Ode to Massachusetts" and included references in it to several municipalities, former president John F. Kennedy, and historic events like the lantern signal which initiated Paul Revere's midnight ride.

== Effort to designate as an official state song ==
Falzone spent four years lobbying the legislature to designate his song as an official one for the state. In the 1997–1998 legislative session, State Sen. Robert Travaglini filed bill S.2259 but the legislature did not act upon it. Travaglini filed it again in the 1999–2000 session as S.1482. Falzone regularly visited the Massachusetts State House to try to convince the legislators to support making the song as an official one for the state, with Travaglini's aide Christian Scorzoni calling Falzone "the most persistent constituent we've had." Ultimately, on November 14, 2000, the state House of Representatives approved the bill, with the state Senate following a couple days later on November 16. At the Senate vote, he was asked to sing the ode for the assembled senators and happily obliged, following up by autographing songsheets for senators as well. Scorzoni said about the event that he had "never seen a guy so happy."

The bill was officially enacted on November 22, 2000, as Chapter 323 of the Acts of 2000. This added as section 47 of Massachusetts General Law chapter 2 that "The words and music of 'Ode to Massachusetts' by Joseph Falzone shall be the official ode of the commonwealth."
