= Arthur Franklin Mapes =

American poet

Arthur Franklin Mapes was a poet who lived between 16 March 1913 and January 4, 1986. Among his works is the poem "Indiana," adopted as the Official State Poem of Indiana in 1963. In 1977, he was designated Indiana State Poet Laureate, a position that was not officially recognized by the State of Indiana until July 1, 2005. Much of his poetry reflected his humble beginnings and the love he had for his hometown, Kendallville, and state. His poetry also reflected his feelings on God, family, and nature. Many of his poems were printed in national and international publications.

Mapes was born and raised in Kendallville in a family of eight children. He married Ruth Acker and had ten children. He worked at Flint & Walling, Inc. for many years as a mechanic. During his career, he won eight awards at the state, national and international levels, which include The Golden Quill Award of 1965 for the poem '"Winter Cavern." He was a member of the Indiana Poetry Society, the Poets' Corner, and was a columnist for Cornucopia Poetry Magazine.

In 1980, his collected poetry was published in a limited-edition hardcover book, Indiana Memories. Posthumously, his family published several topical paperback volumes. His poetry can be viewed today on a website created and maintained by his granddaughter, Angela Mapes Turner.

== Works ==
Poems
The Blacklegs
The Big Tornado(unpublished)
Bixler Lake
Conner Prairie
I Remember Indiana (unpublished)
Indiana
My Hoosier Hills
Our Town
These Hills
Wabash River
Winter Cavern

Collections
Poems of the Hoosier Hills
The Hoosier Way
Indiana Memories
