= Seal of Massachusetts =

Official government emblem of the U.S. state of Massachusetts

Great Seal of the Commonwealth of Massachusetts
- Armiger: Commonwealth of Massachusetts
- Adopted: December 13, 1780
- Motto: Ense petit placidam sub libertate quietem

Coat of arms of the Commonwealth of Massachusetts

Versions
- The simplified coat of arms used in the state flag and larger signage

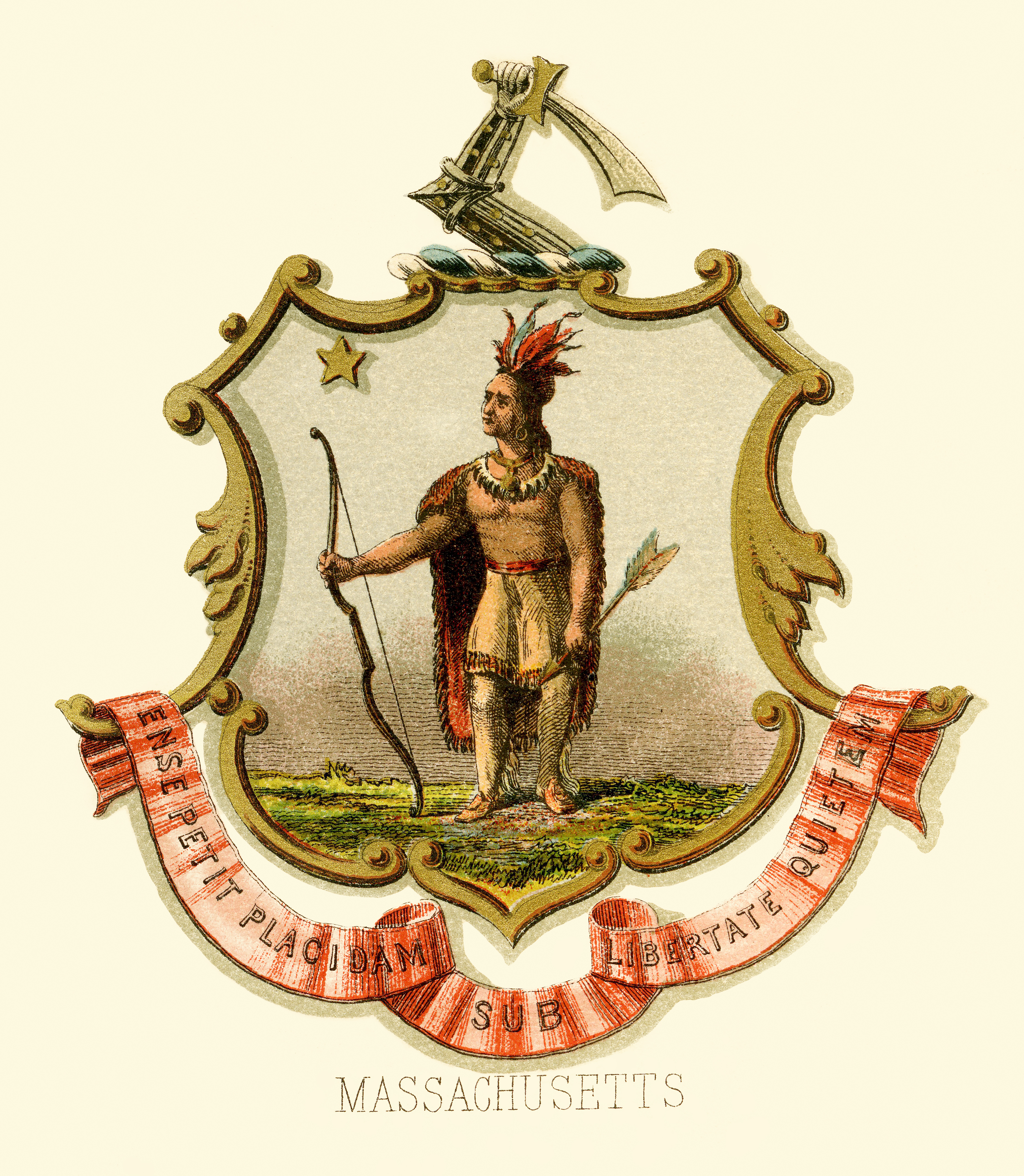
- Historical coat of arms (1876)
- Armiger: Commonwealth of Massachusetts
- Adopted: 1775
- Shield: Azure, a Native American passant. Holding in his dexter hand a bow, holding in his sinister hand an arrow. All Or. In dexter chief a mullet of 5 Argent.
- Motto: Ense petit placidam sub libertate quietem

The Great Seal of the Commonwealth of Massachusetts contains the coat of arms of Massachusetts. The coat of arms is encircled by the Latin text "Sigillum Reipublicæ Massachusettensis" (literally, The Seal of the Republic of Massachusetts). The Massachusetts Constitution designates the form of government a "commonwealth", for which respublica is the correct Latin term. The seal uses the coat of arms of Massachusetts as its central element.

An official emblem of the state, the coat of arms was adopted by the Legislature in 1775 and then reaffirmed by Governor John Hancock and his Council in 1780. The present rendition of the seal was drawn by resident-artist Edmund H. Garrett and was adopted by the state in 1900. While the inscription around the seal is officially in Latin, a variant with "Commonwealth of Massachusetts" in English is also sometimes used.

== History ==
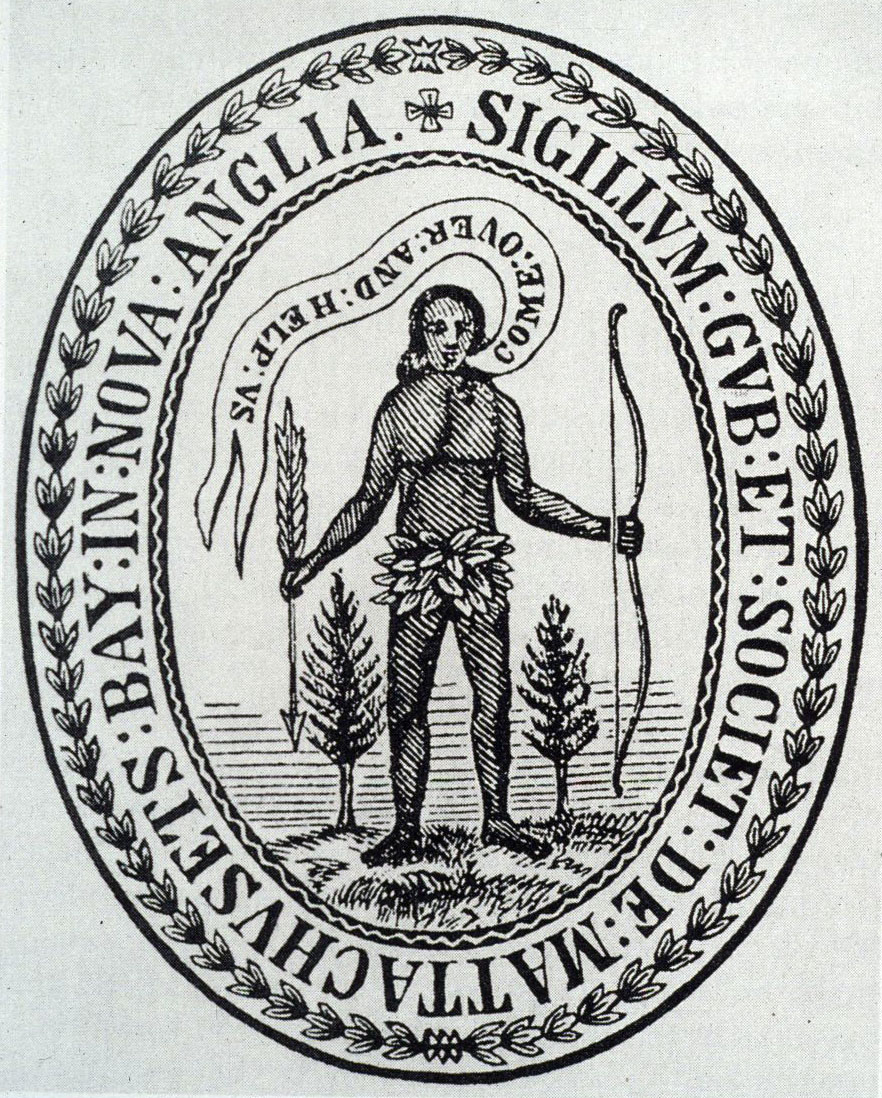
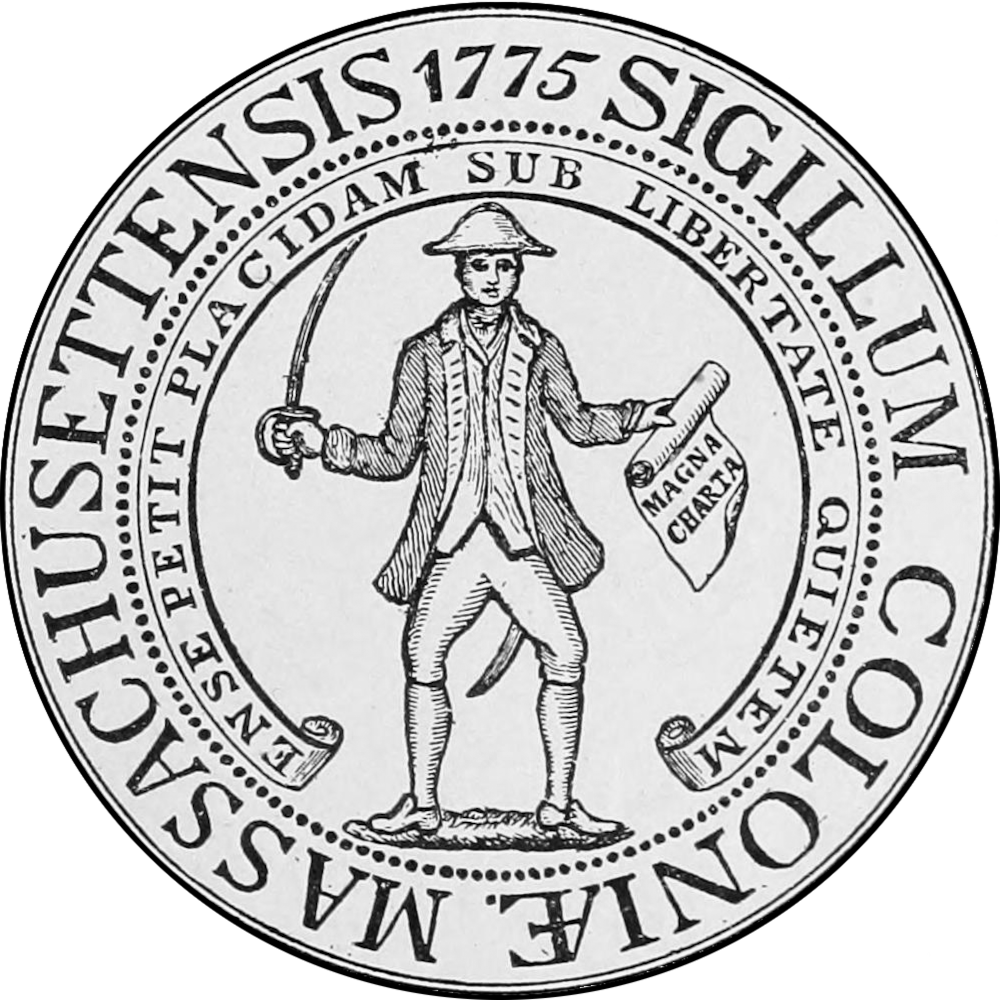
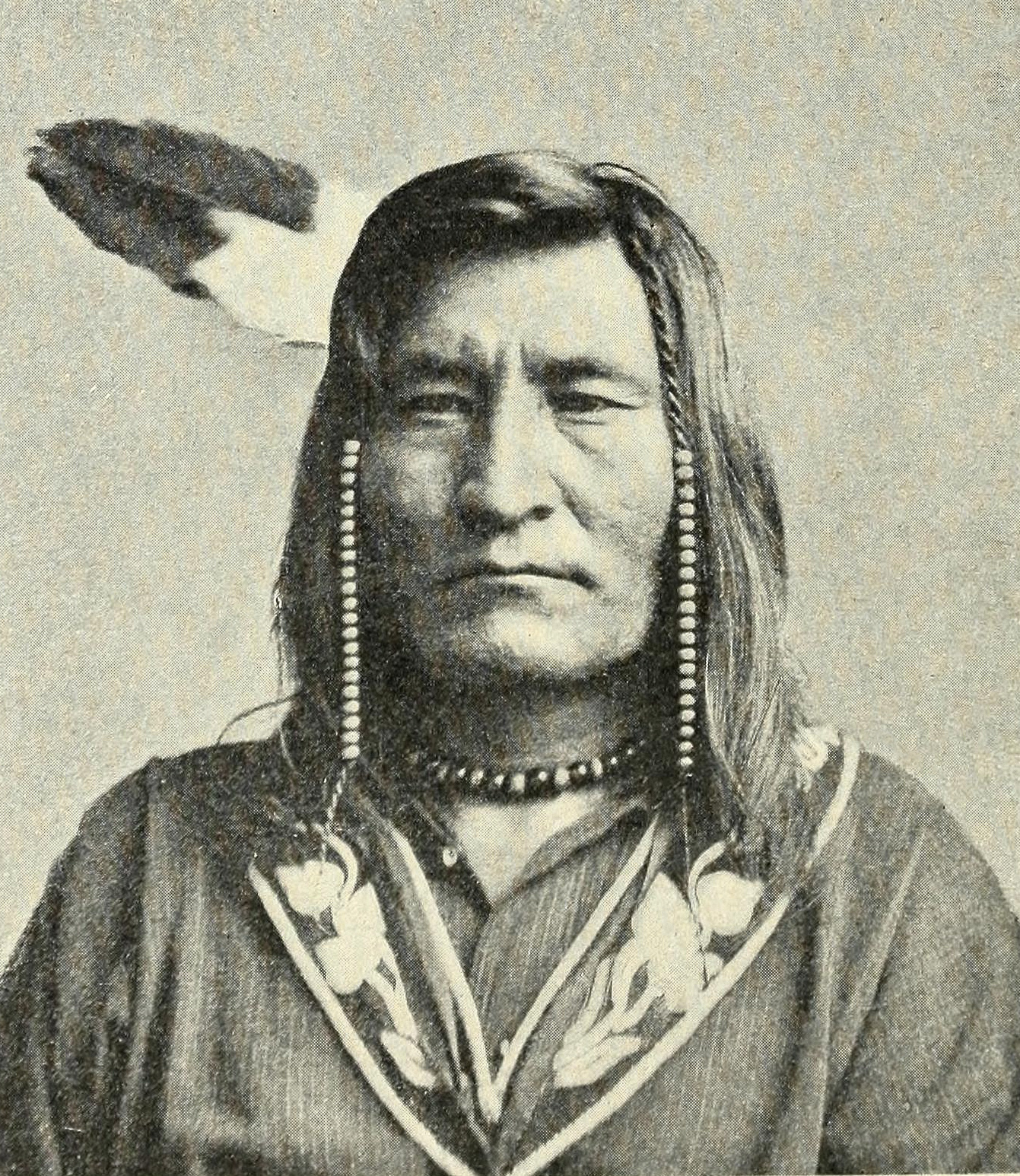
Elements of the present seal. The first seal of the Bay Colony had a crude portrayal of a Native with his arrow pointed in a gesture of peace (left). The 1775 revolution seal featured the motto, and armed sword today seen upon the seal crest (right), and Thomas Little Shell (center), the Ojibwe chief whose likeness was model for the present-day seal, in tandem with dress relics of those tribes who inhabited Massachusetts.

The first seal of Massachusetts Bay Colony showed a nude American Indian with a bush covering his genitals. Like the current seal, he held in his hand an arrow pointed down. A scroll came out over his mouth with the words "Come over and help us." This quotation originates from Acts 16:9: "And a vision appeared to Paul in the night; There stood a man of Macedonia, and prayed him, saying, Come over into Macedonia, and help us." (Authorized Version). This initial seal thus emphasized the missionary and commercial intentions of the original colonists. This seal was authorized as part of the charter granted by King Charles I in 1629; it was used until 1689.

In June 1676, during King Philip's War, the Bay Colony ordered an updated version of this seal stamped onto medallions which were issued to Indian Christians fighting on behalf of Boston. This seal removed the peaceful slogan of the original seal, replacing it with the message, "In the present Warr with the Heathen Natives of this Land / They giving us peace and mercy at their hands." In 1689–1692, after the end of the war, the original slogan was temporarily revived. The gradual loss of the missionary message was part of a pattern throughout the British colonies at this time, as the experience of war dampened enthusiasm for conversion and integration.

In 1775, a Revolutionary seal appeared, depicting a minuteman with a sword in his right hand and Magna Carta in his left. Following the Revolutionary War, the sword was incorporated into the crest of the traditional coat of arms. The Revolutionary seal was the first time the Latin motto used by the state today, appeared on a state seal, and meant that the colony no longer recognized the authority of the royal governor General Thomas Gage.

The source is attributed to the letter written by a father of an English soldier and politician Algernon Sidney: "It is said that the University of Copenhagen brought their album unto you, desiring you to write something therein; and that you did scribere in albo these words: 'Manus haec inimica tyrannis ense petit placidam sub libertate quietem'". Translated, this means "This hand of mine, which is hostile to tyrants, seeks by the sword quiet peace under liberty." The last words were then written in Sidney's "Book of Mottoes", particularly favored by some in the American colonies. Metrically, the motto is dactylic hexameter.

The next seal was adopted by the Provincial Congress on December 13, 1780. The shield depicts an "Indian" with bow and arrow. The arrow is pointed downward, signifying peace. A silver star with five points appears next to the figure's head, although this is represented as white on the flag. A blue ribbon, with blue signifying the Blue Hills of Quincy, Canton and Milton, surrounds the shield, bearing the state motto "Ense petit placidam sub libertate quietem." This comes from the Book of Mottoes in the Royal Danish Library in Copenhagen, Denmark, written about 1659 by Algernon Sydney, an English soldier and politician.

It was adopted in 1775 by the Provincial Congress and the literal translation is, "With a sword, she seeks quiet peace under liberty." Although the looser English translation more commonly used is, "By the sword we seek peace, but peace only under liberty." Above the shield is the state military crest: a bent arm holding a broadsword aloft. The sword has its blade up, to remind that it was through the American Revolution that independence was won.

The current form of the 1780 seal was adopted in 1890, replacing the Massachusetts Indian with a composite. The composite's head was taken from a Chippewa chief in Montana.

A stained glass window at the top of the Grand Staircase at the State House shows all the seals used in Massachusetts, including the royal seals of the governors during colonial days.

== Controversy over Minuteman's sword and Native American imagery ==
A number of lawmakers and Massachusetts residents, including some Native Americans, have called for the imagery on the state seal to be changed. Specifically, advocates note that the seal depicts a colonist's broadsword directly above a depiction of a Native American's head, with some calling the depiction a "form of white supremacist imagery". American vexillologist Ted Kaye noted that the sword symbolizes liberty from the British and was "not meant to be oppressing the Indian," though "certainly that's how people perceive it."

On January 11, 2021, Governor Charlie Baker signed a bill establishing a commission to change the state flag and seal. On May 17, 2022, the commission voted unanimously to recommend changing the state symbols. In late 2023, after the Special Commission on Official Seal and Motto of the Commonwealth issued a final report calling for a new seal and motto, the Senate and House of the Commonwealth issued a bill that called for the Secretary of the Commonwealth to create an Acting Commission that will issue a request for proposals for a new seal based on the symbols and terms proposed by the Special Commission. No details on timeline or budget have been made public.

== Other seals of Massachusetts ==
Alternative (unofficial) depiction of the state seal that is occasionally used

Seal of the governor of Massachusetts

Seal of the Massachusetts House of Representatives

Seal of the Massachusetts Senate

Alternative seal of the Massachusetts Senate

Seal of the Massachusetts State Police

== Historical seals ==
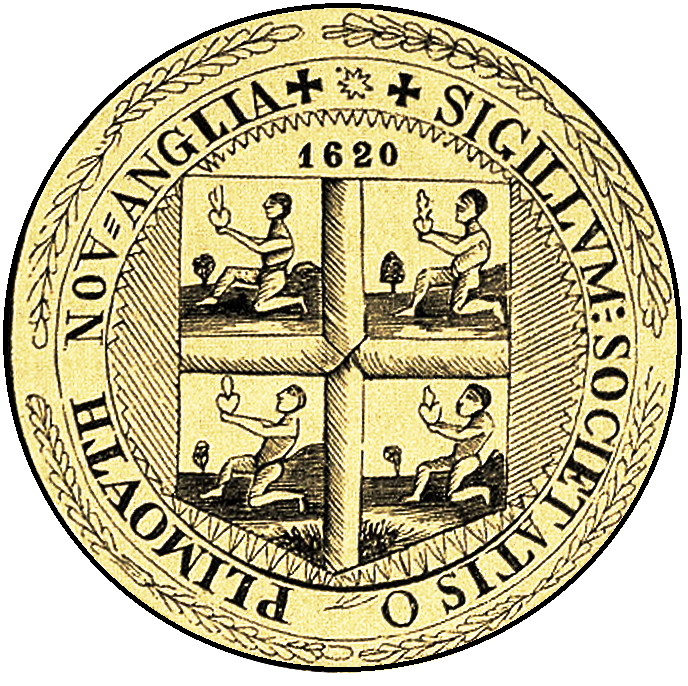
Seal of the Plymouth Colony, (c. 1620–1629)

Seal of the Massachusetts Bay Colony, (1629–1686, 1689–1691)

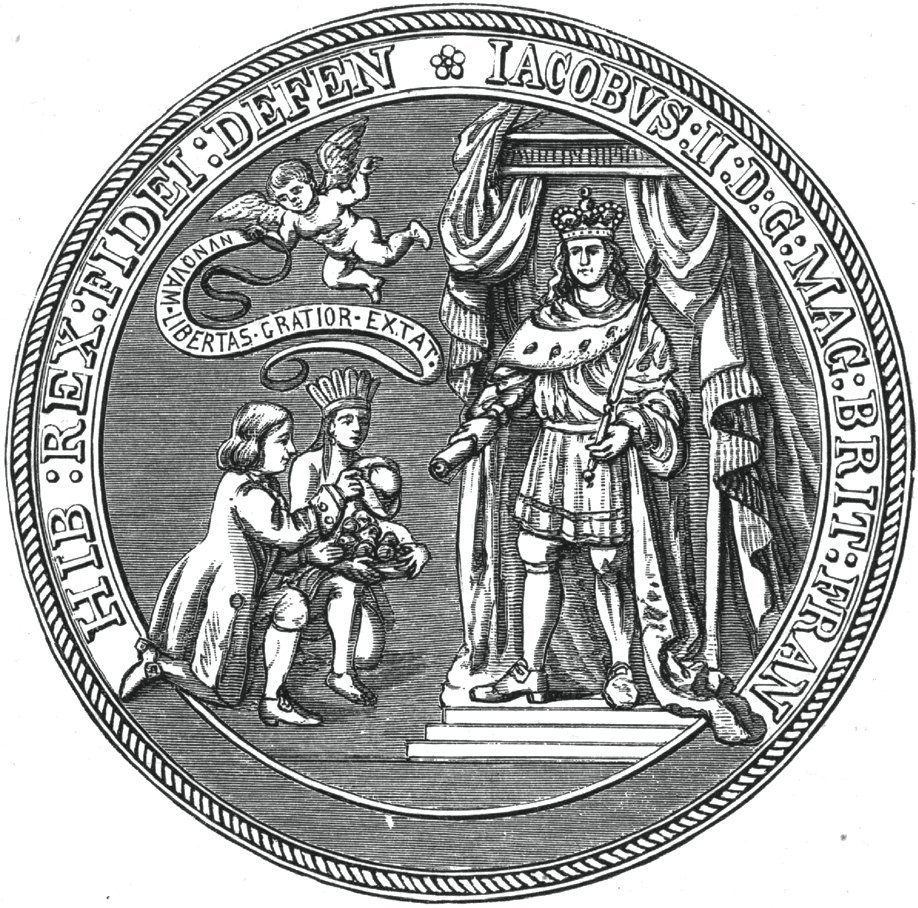
Seal of the Dominion of New England (1686–1689)

Coat of arms of Great Britain, as Province of Massachusetts Bay (1691–1780)

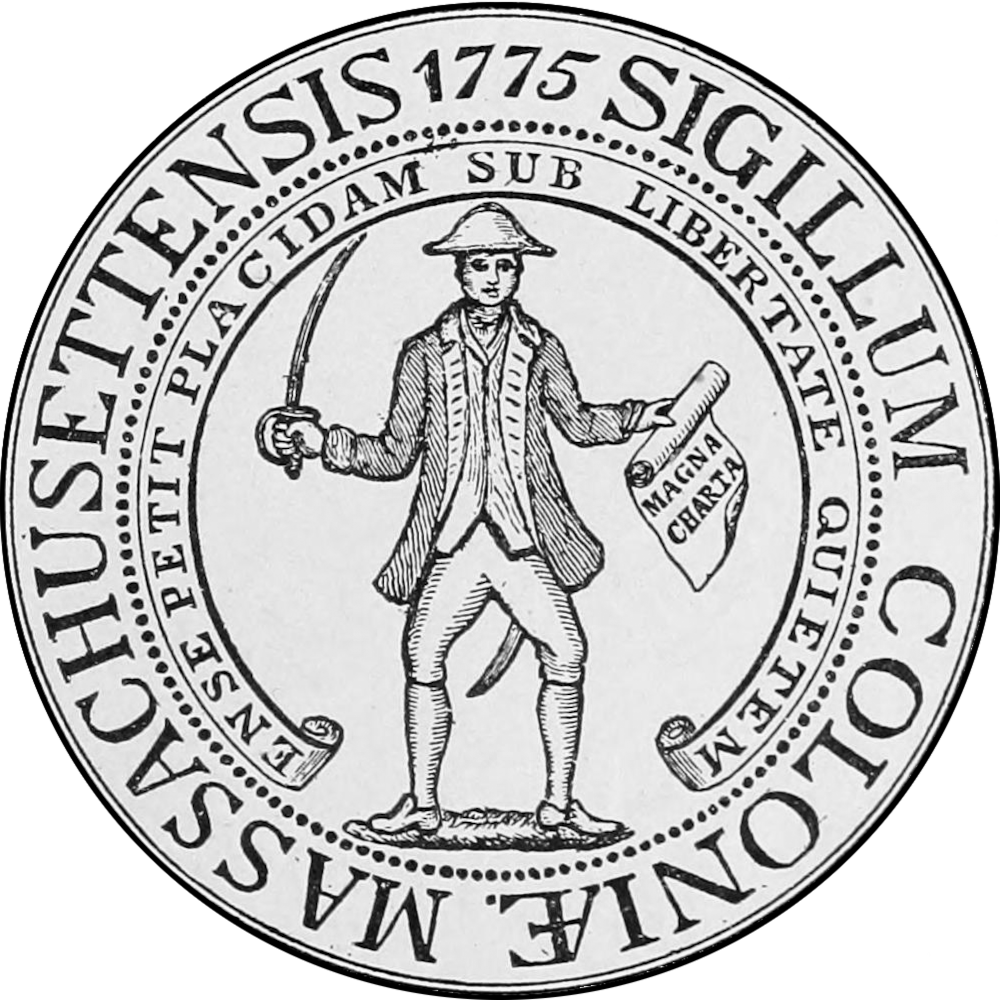
Seal used by the Massachusetts Provincial Congress (1775–1780)

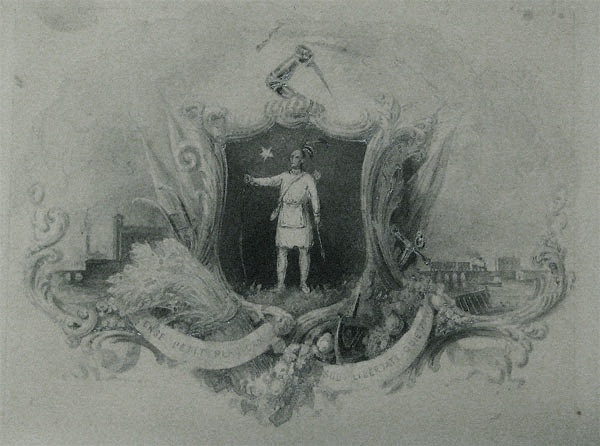
Seal example from 1820, prior to standardization (1780–1900)

== See also ==
- Flag of Massachusetts
