= Current use =

Current use is a phrase used to describe the present condition of land use and the corresponding scheme for property tax incentives for qualifying land owners (typically rural) who wish to preserve open space and avoid having their property assessed at the "best and highest" use that could be made of it (i.e., a housing development or a commercial use). The statutes provide significant savings when the land is currently in use for farming (agriculture and horticulture), silviculture, or comprises wetlands, or even unproductive woods or barrens. Further discounts may accrue if the land owner is willing to file a recreational easement permitting the unimpeded public to come upon the land for non-motorized recreation (e.g., hiking, hunting, bicycling, bird-watching, etc.). Some jurisdictions require a qualifying submittal of a "stewardship plan" for woodlands, while others (including New Hampshire) provide further tax reductions for these optional inclusions. Soils data must often be included for requests related to agricultural areas.

Based upon a modest tax assessment of land that remains undeveloped, the "current use" abatement and recreational easement can result in very affordable tax bills. The reduced burden may help postpone the decision to divide and sell off portions of the undeveloped land as local tax rates climb. The public benefits from the continued presence (or recreational enjoyment) of unfragmented and undeveloped areas until development plans overtake the current use incentives.

In New Hampshire, USA, the owner of ten or more contiguous acres can file for the current use abatement for that portion of land not currently covered by structures or other improvements. The same application form is used to request the recreational easement, which is then recorded in the county registry of deeds. The abatement then persists until the land is subdivided or developed, at which time the local tax authority can reclaim some of the deferred taxes through a "change of use" tax. The recreation easement may also be revoked (or suspended for three years) if the land owner posts the property against trespassing.

There is often an influx of new "current use" requests each time a town increases its assessments of open space, and the impact of this factor must be anticipated in the municipal tax budget. For example, a town with non-participating parcels may have only a net tax increase in the first-year after a higher assessment as many remaining qualified open parcels will join the current use program. Once they obtain the statutory abatement, they may actually pay less tax than before the higher assessments were imposed.

== See also ==
- Property tax in the United States
