= 1776 in Massachusetts =

- Decades: 1770s; 1780s; 1790s
- See also: History of Massachusetts; Historical outline of Massachusetts; List of years in Massachusetts; 1776 in the United States

The following is a list of events of the year 1776 in Massachusetts.

== Events ==
- March 5 – Fortification of Dorchester Heights
- March 17 – The Siege of Boston ends in an American victory.
- Fort Andrew and Fort Revere are constructed
- The Boston Caucus is dissolved

== See also ==
- 1776 in the United States
