= 2026 in Massachusetts =

- Decades: 2000s; 2010s; 2020s
- See also: History of Massachusetts; Historical outline of Massachusetts; List of years in Massachusetts; 2026 in the United States

The following is a list of events of the year 2026 in Massachusetts.

== Incumbents ==
=== State government ===
- Governor: Maura Healey (D)

== Events ==
=== January ===
- January 29 – Cape Cod Potato Chips announces it will close its original factory located on Cape Cod in Hyannis.

=== February ===
- February 27 – Defense Secretary Pete Hegseth announces the DoD will no longer allow military members to attend Harvard or MIT, among other schools.

=== March ===
- March 19 – Boston University begins requiring faculty members to take down flags and political posters from outward-facing windows. In early April, following backlash from faculty and students, the university pauses the policy.

=== April ===
- April 14 – Hampshire College, located in Amherst, announces it will be closing after the Fall 2026 semester.
- April 20 – The 2026 Boston Marathon is held. John Korir and Sharon Lokedi defend their titles in the men's and women's races, respectively. Marcel Hug wins the men's wheelchair title, and Eden Rainbow-Cooper wins the women's wheelchair title.
- April 23 – Anna Maria College in Paxton announces it will close at the end of the semester.

=== May ===
- May 4 – The Department of Education opens an investigation against Smith College over its admittance of transgender women.
- May 20 – Harvard faculty approve a policy to limit A grades in undergraduate courses to 20% of enrollment beginning fall 2027 in an effort to curb grade inflation.
- May 22 – Uber and Lyft drivers unionize following a voter approved November 2024 ballot measure, the first recognized gig ride-share workers union in the U.S.
- May 30 – A meteor explodes off the coast of Massachusetts, emitting a loud boom that is heard in Boston area. The sound of the boom is reported as far south as Johnston, Rhode Island.

=== June ===
- June 4 – The National Park Service orders the Bunker Hill Monument to remove three displays containing quotes related to slavery, women's suffrage, and immigration, respectively.
- June 11–July 19 – The United States hosts the 2026 FIFA World Cup, with a number of matches being held in Gillette Stadium in Foxborough.

=== July ===
- July 8 – The Women's Pro Baseball League reveals its four inaugural teams, including the Boston Hunters.

=== August ===
- August 20 – The Massachusetts Supreme Judicial Court affirms a lower court ruling saying that Quincy Mayor Thomas P. Koch cannot install Catholic statues on a public safety building.
- August 31 – The Last Ditch Bar in Greenfield announces it is relaxing its mask rule so that patrons will no longer be required to wear KN95 masks on Saturdays. The announcement sparks some controversy among some patrons, who accuse the bar of harming immunocompromised people. An article by The Boston Globe about the controversy later goes viral.

=== September ===
- September 4 – A mistrial is declared in the trial of Lindsey Clancy, who killed her three children in Duxbury in 2023. The defense argued the killings were a result of postpartum psychosis, while prosecutors argued she was aware of her actions when she killed the children.
- September 8 – Looksmaxxing influencer Clavicular, real name Braden Peters, is charged with rape in Barnstable County. The complaint alleges Peters got a 17-year-old girl drunk on vodka in May 2025 and raped her.
- September 18–October 4 – The Big E 2026 is held in West Springfield.

=== October ===
- October 17 – Lieutenant governor candidate Shawn Oliver is charged with DUI following a late night crash in New Bedford. He suspends his campaign the next day following a request by his running mate Mike Minogue.

=== November ===
- November 3 – 2026 Massachusetts elections:
  - 2026 Massachusetts House of Representatives election
  - 2026 Massachusetts Senate election
  - 2026 Massachusetts Attorney General election
  - 2026 Massachusetts gubernatorial election: Maura Healey wins reelection.
  - 2026 Massachusetts Secretary of the Commonwealth election
  - 2026 United States House of Representatives elections in Massachusetts
  - 2026 United States Senate election in Massachusetts: Ed Markey wins reelection.
- November 10 – Former Stoughton Police officer Matthew Farwell is convicted of the 2021 murder of Sandra Birchmore, a 23-year-old woman he had groomed when she was a teenager in a police explorer program.

=== Sports ===
- 2025–26 Boston Bruins season
- 2025–26 Boston Celtics season
- 2026 Boston Red Sox season

== See also ==
- 2026 in the United States
