= 2023 in Massachusetts =

- Decades: 2000s; 2010s; 2020s
- See also: History of Massachusetts; Historical outline of Massachusetts; List of years in Massachusetts; 2023 in the United States

The following is a list of events of the year 2023 in Massachusetts.

== Incumbents ==
=== State government ===
- Governor: Charlie Baker (R) (until January 5), Maura Healey (D) (starting January 5)

== Events ==
- April 13 – 2023 Pentagon document leaks: The U.S. FBI arrests 21-year-old Massachusetts Air National Guardsman Jack Teixeira for allegedly leaking government documents to a Discord gaming group.
- June 14 – At the International Society for Stem Cell Research's annual meeting in Boston, developmental biologist Magdalena Żernicka-Goetz reveals that American and British researchers have generated the world's first synthetic human embryo-like structures using stem cells. Żernicka-Goetz suggests that the findings could provide insights into the causes of miscarriages.
- August 25 – Officials in Boston announce police will remove tents and other makeshift shelters at the Mass and Cass tent city, an encampment for the homeless, many of whom struggle with mental health issues and substance abuse disorders.

== See also ==
- 2023 in the United States
