= 2025 in Massachusetts =

- Decades: 2000s; 2010s; 2020s
- See also: History of Massachusetts; Historical outline of Massachusetts; List of years in Massachusetts; 2025 in the United States

The following is a list of events of the year 2025 in Massachusetts.

== Incumbents ==
=== State government ===
- Governor: Maura Healey (D)

== Events ==
- February 12–20 – 2025 4 Nations Face-Off
- March 24 – The Fall River/New Bedford Line opens as the first phase of the South Coast Rail project.
- March 25 – Tufts University student Rümeysa Öztürk is detained by Homeland Security agents near her home in Somerville. The same day, a protest against her detention is held in nearby Cambridge. Öztürk had written a pro-Palestinian op-ed, but was otherwise not known to be involved in protests.
- April 2 – A protest against Rümeysa Öztürk's detention is held in Boston. Mayor Michelle Wu and State Attorney General Andrea Campbell are among the participants.
- May 8 – Immigration and Customs Enforcement (ICE) pulls a vehicle over containing two sisters in Worcester, later joined by the Worcester Police Department. Protesters gather during the operation. In total, three people are arrested; a Brazilian national who is the mother of the sisters is arrested by ICE. Worcester Police arrest the woman's 17-year-old daughter and a local school board candidate and protester.
- May 22 – The Trump administration bars Harvard University from enrolling international students. The DHS says foreign students currently enrolled at Harvard must transfer to other institutions. A federal judge blocks the order.
- June 4 – Worcester City Councilor Etel Haxhiaj is arrested in connection to the ICE raid that occurred May 8. She is charged with assault and battery on a police officer.
- June 18 – Karen Read, who was charged with murder in the death of her boyfriend, Boston Police Officer John O'Keefe in Canton, is found not guilty on the three major charges, though she is found guilty of operating under the influence.
- July 13 – A fire at an assisted-living facility in Fall River kills ten people.
- July 25 – Concession workers at Fenway Park and MGM Music Hall go on strike.
- September 4 – The Trump administration sues the city of Boston over its sanctuary city laws.
- September 18 – Massachusetts and nine other Northeastern states announce the formation of the Northeast Public Health Collaborative, a coalition of local health leaders.
- November 1 – An intentional explosion caused by a Roman candle is reported at a medical building at Harvard University. No injuries are reported. Two men are arrested days later.
- November 4 – 2025 Boston mayoral election: Incumbent Mayor Michelle Wu wins reelection in an unopposed race.
- December 15 – Nuno F. Loureiro, the director of the Massachusetts Institute of Technology's Plasma Science and Fusion Center, is shot and killed at his home in Brookline. The gunman, who days earlier had killed two people in a shooting at Brown University, dies by suicide in New Hampshire on December 18.

== See also ==
- 2025 in the United States
