= 2024 in Massachusetts =

- Decades: 2000s; 2010s; 2020s
- See also: History of Massachusetts; Historical outline of Massachusetts; List of years in Massachusetts; 2024 in the United States

The following is a list of events of the year 2024 in Massachusetts.

== Incumbents ==
=== State government ===
- Governor: Maura Healey (D)

== Events ==
- March 5 – Super Tuesday:
  - 2024 Massachusetts Democratic presidential primary.
  - 2024 Massachusetts Republican presidential primary.
- April 25 – Police arrest 118 protesters at Emerson College.
- April 27 – Police arrest 98 protesters at Northeastern University.
- May 7 – Police arrest 109 people at a pro-Palestinian encampment at the University of Massachusetts Amherst.
- May 10 – Police dismantle encampments and arrest dozens of students protesting at the Massachusetts Institute of Technology in Cambridge.
- June 16 – Seven people are injured, and one other person is injured while running away in a shooting at a pop-up party in Methuen.
- August 6 – Massachusetts District Judge Richard Stearns rules that Harvard University must face a lawsuit accusing the university of intentionally ignoring requests for safety from Jewish students following "severe and pervasive harassment" on campus, while also calling the university's claims that antisemitic acts are protected under the First Amendment "dubious".

== See also ==
- 2024 in the United States
