= Miscarriage risks =

Factors that increase the chance of a miscarriage

Miscarriage risks are those circumstances, conditions, and substances that increase the risk of miscarriage. Some risks are modifiable and can be changed. Other risks cannot be modified and can't be changed. Risks can be firmly tied to miscarriages and others are still under investigation. In addition, there are those circumstances and treatments that have not been found effective in preventing miscarriage. When a woman keeps having miscarriages, infertility is present.

- Anatomical defect in the mother
- Amniocentesis
- Chorionic villus sampling
- Age >30
- Smoking and exposure tobacco smoke
- Obesity
- Diabetes
- Thyroid disorders (e.g. hypothyroidism)
- Alcohol use
- Cannabis use
- Chromosomal abnormalities
- Infectious diseases
- Radiation exposure
- Endocrine
- Genetic and chromosome abnormalities
  - Autosomal trisomy
  - Monosomy X (45, X)
  - Triploidy
  - Structural abnormality of the chromosome
  - Double or triple trisomy
- Uterine structural abnormalities
- Uterine fibroids
- Cervical abnormalities
- Hormonal abnormalities
- Reproductive tract infection
- Tissue rejection
- Autoimmune disorder
  - Coeliac disease
  - Lupus
  - Antiphospholipid antibody syndrome
  - Anti-thyroid autoantibodies
- Placenta abnormality
- Previous miscarriage
- Eating disorders bulimia nervosa and anorexia nervosa
- Hyperemesis gravidarum
- Illicit or recreational drugs
- Caffeine
- Food poisoning
  - Salmonella
  - Listeriosis
  - Toxoplasmosis
- Some surgeries and medications
  - Antidepressants
  - Nonsteroidal anti-inflammatory drugs, such as ibuprofen
  - Methotrexate
  - Retinoids
- Trauma
- Chemotherapy
- Polyendocrine metabolic ovarian syndrome (PMOS)
- Luteal phase defect
- Mycoplasma genitalium infection
- Rubella (German measles)
- Cytomegalovirus
- Bacterial vaginosis
- Sexually transmitted infections HIV, chlamydia, gonorrhoea and syphilis
- Malaria
- Chemicals
  - DDT
  - Lead
  - Formaldehyde
  - Arsenic
  - Benzene
  - Ethylene oxide
- Working conditions
  - Night shift work
  - >40-hour work week
  - Lack of accommodation for strenuous working conditions
- Psychological stress

== Bibliography ==
- Hoffman, Barbara (2012). Williams gynecology. New York: McGraw-Hill Medical. ISBN 978-0-07-171672-7.
