= Demographics of Massachusetts =

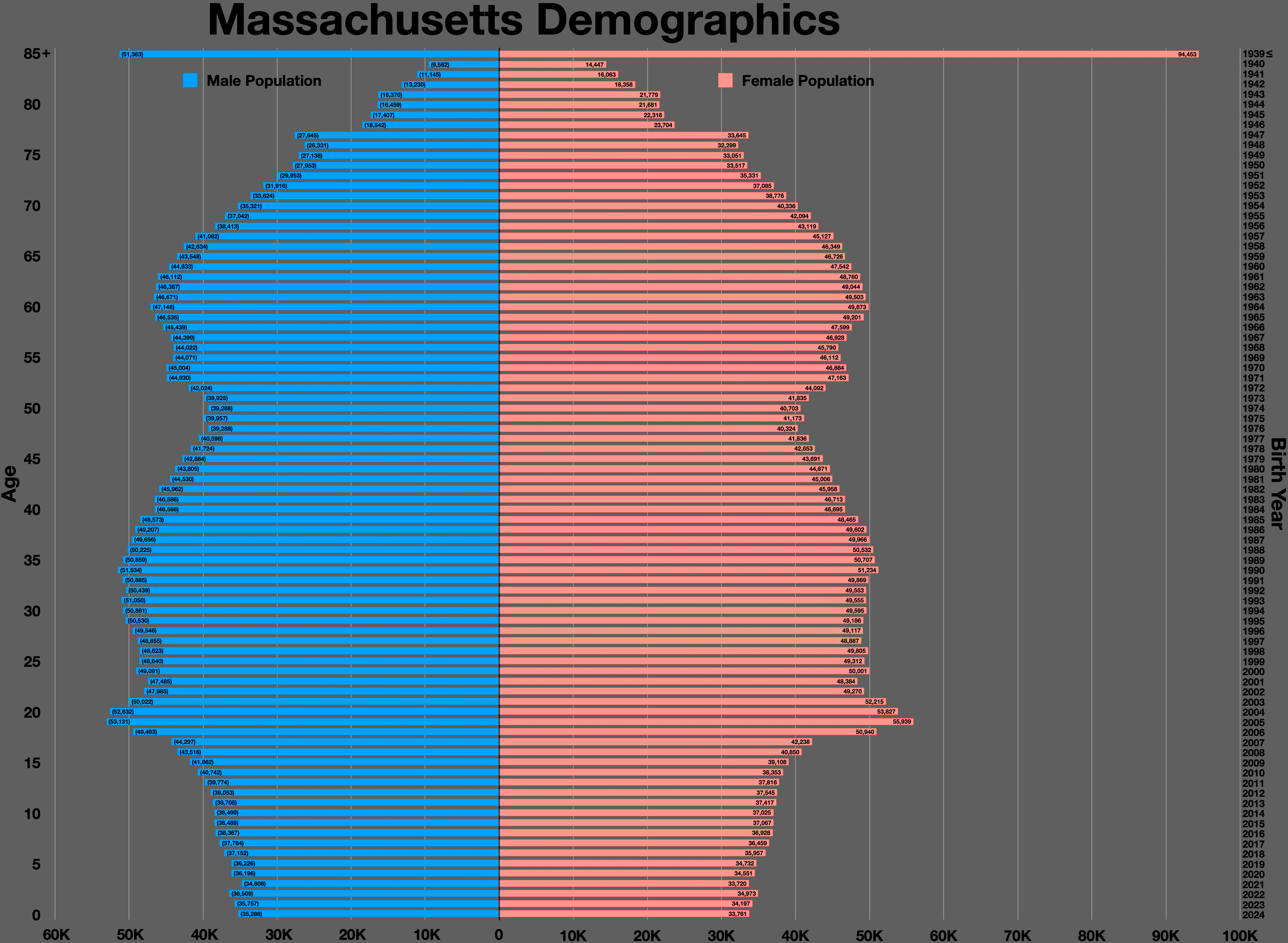
Massachusetts population pyramid

Massachusetts had about 7.2 million people in 2025, according to the U.S. Census Bureau. That is 1.8% more than the 7.029 million of the 2020 census. Massachusetts is the sixteenth most populous U.S. state.

Historical population
| Census | Pop. | Note | %± |
|---|---|---|---|
| 1790 | 378,787 | | — |
| 1800 | 422,845 | | 11.6% |
| 1810 | 472,040 | | 11.6% |
| 1820 | 523,287 | | 10.9% |
| 1830 | 610,408 | | 16.6% |
| 1840 | 737,699 | | 20.9% |
| 1850 | 994,514 | | 34.8% |
| 1860 | 1,231,066 | | 23.8% |
| 1870 | 1,457,351 | | 18.4% |
| 1880 | 1,783,085 | | 22.4% |
| 1890 | 2,238,947 | | 25.6% |
| 1900 | 2,805,346 | | 25.3% |
| 1910 | 3,366,416 | | 20.0% |
| 1920 | 3,852,356 | | 14.4% |
| 1930 | 4,249,614 | | 10.3% |
| 1940 | 4,316,721 | | 1.6% |
| 1950 | 4,690,514 | | 8.7% |
| 1960 | 5,148,578 | | 9.8% |
| 1970 | 5,689,170 | | 10.5% |
| 1980 | 5,737,037 | | 0.8% |
| 1990 | 6,016,425 | | 4.9% |
| 2000 | 6,349,097 | | 5.5% |
| 2010 | 6,547,629 | | 3.1% |
| 2020 | 7,029,917 | | 7.4% |
| 2025 (est.) | 7,154,084 | | 1.8% |

Massachusetts experiences significant population churn, with some Bay Staters leaving every year and many others arriving, including immigrants from across the United States and the world. Massachusetts in 2020 included 1.2 million foreign-born residents.

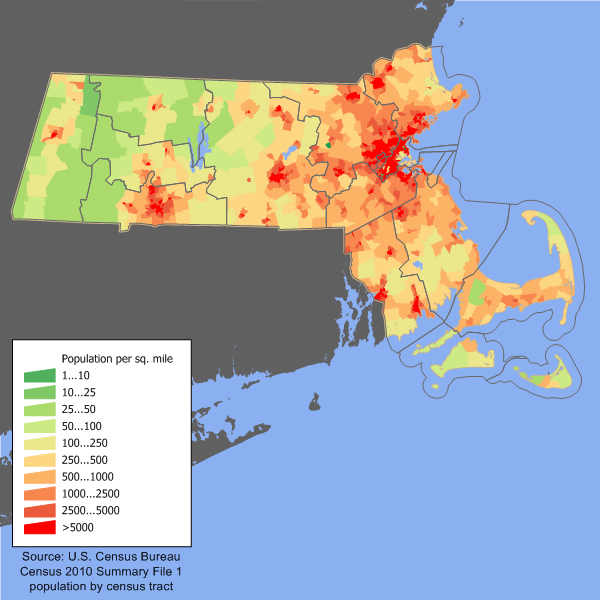
Massachusetts population density map

Most Bay Staters live within a 60-mile radius of the State House on Beacon Hill, often called Greater Boston: the City of Boston, neighboring cities and towns, the North Shore, South Shore, the northern, western, and southern suburbs, and most of southeastern and central Massachusetts. Eastern Massachusetts is more urban than Western Massachusetts, which is primarily rural, save for the cities of Springfield, Chicopee, Holyoke, and Northampton, which serve as centers of population density in the Pioneer Valley of the Connecticut River. The center of population of Massachusetts is located in Middlesex County, in the town of Natick.

== Population ==
The population in 2025 was 7,154,084, making Massachusetts the 16th most populous state. The population density, 895 people per square mile, ranks Massachusetts the third densest of the fifty states (fifth including District of Columbia and Puerto Rico).

The following statistics are from the U.S. Census Bureau and associated estimates.

=== Age ===
The median age is 40.3 years. There are 5,645,986 people 18 years or older.

The population's age is distributed as follows.

Est. Age Distribution (2022)
| Age | Percent | Totals |
|---|---|---|
| 0–9 | 10.1% | 702,092 |
| 10–19 | 12% | 840,926 |
| 20–29 | 13.9% | 970,145 |
| 30–39 | 13.7% | 953,963 |
| 40–49 | 12.1% | 847,226 |
| 50–59 | 13.3% | 928,751 |
| 60–69 | 12.7% | 885,484 |
| 70–79 | 8% | 559,867 |
| 80+ | 4.2% | 293,520 |

The state's population is 49% male and 51% female; the total sex ratio of Massachusetts is 94.3 male/100 female.

=== Health indicators ===
In 2020, the average life expectancy (at birth) was 79.0 years old, which was the fifth-highest in the US.

The majority of deaths in Massachusetts are attributable to cancer, as of the CDC's 2023 data. Other major causes of death in the state are heart disease, COVID-19, accidents, and chronic lower respiratory diseases.

In 2021, Massachusetts's age-adjusted death rate was 721.4 deaths per 100,000 residents.

==== Birth rate ====
In 2021, the fertility rate in Massachusetts was 49 per 1,000 women aged 15–44 (~4.9%), the fourth-lowest in the US. Data from the American Community Survey 2022, which includes women ages 15–50, suggests a slightly lower fertility rate (4.3%).

People who gave birth in the past year, as of 2022 data, in Massachusetts were primarily in the 30–35 age range (11.2%) or in the 35–39 age range (8.1%).

Of births recorded by 2021 data, 31.8% were delivered via Cesarean section.

== Ancestry ==
According to the 2015–2019 American Community Survey 5-Year Estimates, the largest ancestry groups in Massachusetts are:

| Ancestry | Percentage of Massachusetts population | Percentage of United States population | Difference |
|---|---|---|---|
| Irish | 19.77% | 9.71% | +10.06pp |
| Italian | 12.27% | 5.14% | +7.13pp |
| English | 9.20% | 7.24% | +1.96pp |
| French | 5.90% | 2.34% | +3.56pp |
| German | 5.67% | 13.25% | -7.58pp |
| Polish | 4.40% | 2.80% | +1.60pp |
| Portuguese | 4.07% | 0.42% | +3.65pp |
| American | 3.81% | 6.24% | -2.43pp |
| French Canadian | 3.75% | 0.64% | +3.11pp |
| Sub-Saharan African | 2.25% | 1.15% | +1.09pp |
| Scottish | 2.14% | 1.66% | +0.47pp |
| West Indian | 2.04% | 0.92% | +1.12pp |
| Swedish | 1.55% | 1.15% | +0.40pp |
| Russian | 1.46% | 0.80% | +0.66pp |
| European | 1.26% | 1.66% | -0.40pp |
| Brazilian | 1.25% | 0.14% | +1.11pp |
| Greek | 1.16% | 0.39% | +0.77pp |
| Arab | 1.05% | 0.62% | +0.43pp |
| Lithuanian | 0.65% | 0.19% | +0.46pp |
| Canadian | 0.64% | 0.20% | +0.44pp |
| Scotch-Irish | 0.63% | 0.93% | -0.30pp |
| British | 0.56% | 0.60% | -0.03pp |
| Dutch | 0.56% | 1.19% | -0.63pp |
| Norwegian | 0.54% | 1.35% | -0.81pp |
| Eastern European | 0.54% | 0.27% | +0.27pp |

Massachusetts has the most Irish descendants of any state in the country and the fourth-most Italian descendent state in the country (after Connecticut, Rhode Island, and New Jersey) in percentage of total population. Irish Americans are mostly concentrated in the eastern and southeastern parts of the state; the South Shore region has an Irish-descendent population above 40% (giving it the nickname of the "Irish Riviera").

In the 2020 Census, 494,029 Massachusetts residents were identified as African American (of the total 7,029,917). African Americans make up more than 10% of the population in just one county: Suffolk (18.2%). African Americans in the seven counties of Suffolk (145,566), Middlesex (84,670), Norfolk (51,371), Worcester (48,022), Plymouth (45,132), Hampden (41,556), and Essex (33,524) make up more than 91% of all African Americans in the state.

Massachusetts has the most Moroccans, Brazilians, and Ugandans of any state in the country in percentage of total population. Massachusetts also has large communities of people of Finnish, Swedish, Norwegian, Danish and Icelandic descent; Armenian, Turkish, Lebanese, Syrian, Israeli, Palestinian, Jordanian, and Egyptian descent; and Italian and Spanish descent. Other influential ethnicities are Greek Americans, Lithuanian Americans, Polish Americans, German Americans and French Americans. Massachusetts "Yankees," of colonial English ancestry, still have a strong presence. French Canadian Americans form a significant part of the population in central and western Massachusetts, while Polish Americans are prevalent in the Springfield area and English Americans are common in the rural areas of western Massachusetts.

Boston's largest immigrant groups are from Haiti, the Dominican Republic, and China. Lowell, in the northeast of the state, is home to a large Cambodian (Khmer) community, second in the country only to the concentration of Cambodians in Long Beach, California. Massachusetts also has the fastest growing population of South Asians, including Indian people, who are concentrated in such areas of Greater Boston as Shrewsbury, Woburn, Malden, Quincy, Somerville, and Cambridge. Most of them have immigrated to work in medicine, business, engineering, computer science, and finance. There is a flux of Indians immigrating for higher education.

Massachusetts has one of the largest lusophone populations in North America. It has the largest Cape Verdean population and the second-largest Portuguese population (after California) of any state in the United States, and as a percentage of population is second to only Rhode Island for both ethnic groups. Fall River and New Bedford on the south coast have large populations of Portuguese, Brazilian, and Cape Verdean heritage, all of which are also prevalent in the Taunton and Brockton areas. There is a growing Brazilian population in the Boston area (especially in Framingham).

Although a number of the Native American people in New England died in King Philip's War of 1675 or fled the region, some remained. For example, the Wampanoag tribe maintains at reservations at Aquinnah; at Grafton, on Martha's Vineyard; and at Mashpee, on Cape Cod. The Nipmuck maintain two state-recognized reservations in the central part of the state. Many Wampanoags and other native people live outside reservations.

Massachusetts Racial Breakdown of Population (2017)
| Race | Percentage of Massachusetts population | Percentage of United States population |
|---|---|---|
| White | 68.8% | 60.9% |
| White (Non-Hispanic) | 67.0% | 57.7% |
| Hispanic (of any race) | 13.0% | 19.1% |
| Black | 7.1% | 12.2% |
| Asian | 7.2% | 5.9% |
| Native Americans | 0.3% | 1.0% |
| Hawaiians & Pacific Islanders | 0.0% | 0.2% |
| Two or more races | 10.7% | 12.5% |

== Vital statistics ==
Note: Births in table don't add up, because Hispanics are counted both by their ethnicity and by their race, giving a higher overall number.

Live Births by Single Race/Ethnicity of Mother
| Race | 2014 | 2015 | 2016 | 2017 | 2018 | 2019 | 2020 | 2021 | 2022 | 2023 | 2024 |
|---|---|---|---|---|---|---|---|---|---|---|---|
| White | 44,542 (61.9%) | 43,651 (61.0%) | 42,135 (59.1%) | 40,773 (57.7%) | 39,663 (57.4%) | 39,219 (56.7%) | 37,357 (56.2%) | 39,817 (57.6%) | 37,682 (54.9%) | 36,028 (53.7%) | 35,107 (51.5%) |
| Black | 9,276 (12.9%) | 9,288 (13.0%) | 6,873 (9.6%) | 6,953 (9.8%) | 6,826 (9.9%) | 6,850 (9.9%) | 6,580 (9.9%) | 6,674 (9.7%) | 7,125 (10.4%) | 7,300 (10.9%) | 7,752 (11.4%) |
| Asian | 6,599 (9.2%) | 6,713 (9.4%) | 6,422 (9.0%) | 6,067 (8.6%) | 6,183 (8.9%) | 6,228 (9.0%) | 5,826 (8.8%) | 5,471 (7.9%) | 5,630 (8.2%) | 5,268 (7.9%) | 5,582 (8.2%) |
| American Indian | 151 (0.2%) | 141 (0.2%) | 80 (0.1%) | 86 (0.1%) | 76 (0.1%) | 98 (0.1%) | 71 (0.1%) | 63 (0.1%) | 57 (0.1%) | 59 (0.1%) | 50 (>0.1%) |
| Hispanic (any race) | 12,722 (17.7%) | 13,015 (18.2%) | 13,181 (18.5%) | 13,609 (19.2%) | 13,810 (20.0%) | 14,142 (20.5%) | 14,080 (21.2%) | 14,551 (21.0%) | 15,383 (22.4%) | 15,700 (23.4%) | 16,521 (24.2%) |
| Total | 71,908 (100%) | 71,492 (100%) | 71,317 (100%) | 70,702 (100%) | 69,109 (100%) | 69,117 (100%) | 66,428 (100%) | 69,137 (100%) | 68,584 (100%) | 67,093 (100%) | 68,184 (100%) |

- Since 2016, data for births of White Hispanic origin are not collected, but included in one Hispanic group; persons of Hispanic origin may be of any race.

== Languages ==
The most common forms of American English spoken in Massachusetts, other than General American English, are the New England accent and the Boston accent.

Top 10 Non-English Languages Spoken in Massachusetts
| Language | Percentage of population (as of 2010) |
|---|---|
| Spanish | 7.50% |
| Portuguese | 2.97% |
| Chinese (including Cantonese and Mandarin) | 1.59% |
| French | 1.11% |
| French Creole | 0.89% |
| Italian | 0.72% |
| Russian | 0.62% |
| Vietnamese | 0.58% |
| Greek | 0.41% |
| Arabic and Cambodian (including Mon-Khmer) (tied) | 0.37% |

As of 2010, 78.93% (4,823,127) of Massachusetts residents age 5 and older spoke English at home as a primary language, while 7.50% (458,256) spoke Spanish, 2.97% (181,437) Portuguese, 1.59% (96,690) Chinese (which includes Cantonese and Mandarin), 1.11% (67,788) French, 0.89% (54,456) French Creole, 0.72% (43,798) Italian, 0.62% (37,865) Russian, and Vietnamese was spoken as a main language by 0.58% (35,283) of the population over the age of five. In total, 21.07% (1,287,419) of Massachusetts's population age 5 and older spoke a mother language other than English.

== Religion ==
According to the Association of Religion Data Archives the largest single denominations are the Roman Catholic Church with 3,092,296; the United Church of Christ with 121,826; and the Episcopal Church with 98,963 adherents. Jewish congregations had about 275,000 members. In 2020, the Public Religion Research Institute determined 67% of the population of Massachusetts were Christian, and 23% of the population identified as irreligious.

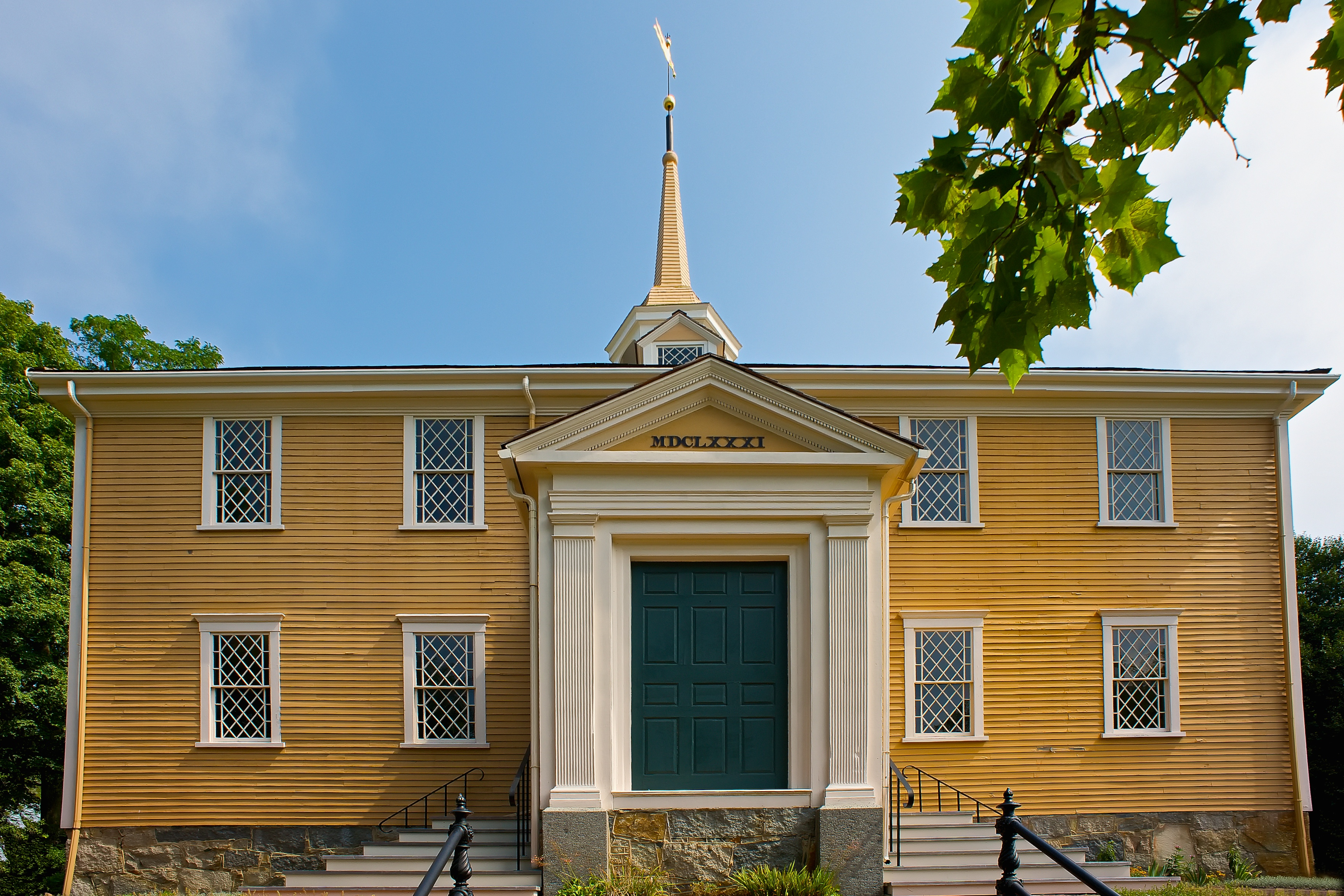
Old Ship Church, Hingham, Massachusetts, built 1681, oldest church in America in continuous ecclesiastical use

As of 2014, the religious affiliations of the people of Massachusetts, according to Pew Research Center were:

| Religion or Denomination | % of Population |
|---|---|
| Catholic | 34 |
| Atheist & Agnostics | 12 |
| Baptist | 5 |
| Christian (no denomination specified) | 3 |
| Methodist | 2 |
| Lutheran | 2 |
| Presbyterian | 2 |
| Nothing in Particular | 20 |
| Pentecostal | 3 |
| Episcopal | 3 |
| Jewish | 3 |
| Muslim | 1 |
| Church of Christ | 1 |
| Congregational/United Church of Christ | 3.5 |
| Buddhist | 1 |
| Other | 3 |

== Migration ==
Massachusetts population pyramid

The latest (2009) estimated Census population figures show that Massachusetts has grown by over 3 percent, to 6,593,587 since 2000. This slow growth is likely attributable to the fact that Massachusetts continues to attract top scholars and researchers from across the United States as well as large numbers of immigrants, combined with steady emigration away from the state towards New Hampshire and southern and western regions of the U.S. because of high housing costs, weather, and traffic.

Recent census data shows that the number of immigrants living in Massachusetts has increased over 5% from 2000 to 2005. The biggest influxes are Latin Americans. According to the census, the population of Central Americans rose by 67.7% between 2000 and 2005, and the number of South Americans rose by 107.5%. And among South Americans, the largest group to increase appeared to be Brazilians, whose numbers rose by 131.4%, to 84,836.

Following the shift to a high-tech economy and the numerous factory closures, few jobs remain for low skilled male workers, who are dropping out of the workforce in large numbers. The percentage of men in the labor force fell from 77.7% in 1989 to 72.8% in 2005. This national trend is most pronounced in Massachusetts. In the case of men without high school diplomas, 10% have left the labor force between 1990 and 2000.

== Homelessness ==
In 1969, the Pine Street Inn was founded by Paul Sullivan on Pine Street in Boston's Chinatown district and began caring for homeless destitute alcoholics. In 1974, Kip Tiernan founded Rosie's Place in Boston, the first drop-in and emergency shelter for women in the United States, in response to the increasing numbers of needy women throughout the country.

In 1980, the Pine Street Inn had to move to larger facilities on Harrison Avenue in Boston and in 1984, Saint Francis House had to move its operation from the St. Anthony Shrine on Arch Street to an entire ten-floor building on Boylston Street.

In 1985, the Boston Health Care for the Homeless Program was founded to assist the growing numbers of homeless living on the streets and in shelters in Boston and who were suffering from lack of effective medical services.

In August 2007, in Boston, Massachusetts, the city took action to keep loiterers, including the homeless, off the Boston Common overnight after a series of violent crimes and drug arrests.

In December 2007, Mayor Thomas M. Menino of Boston announced that the one-night homeless count had revealed that the actual number of homeless living on the streets was down.

In October 2008, Connie Paige of The Boston Globe reported that the number of homeless in Massachusetts had reached an all-time high, primarily due to mortgage foreclosures and the national economic crisis.

In October 2009, as part of the city's Leading the Way initiative, Mayor Thomas Menino of Boston dedicated and opened the Weintraub Day Center, the first city-operated day center for chronically homeless persons. It is a multi-service center providing shelter, counseling, health care, housing assistance, and other support services. It is a 3,400-square-foot (320 m^{2}) facility located in the Woods Mullen Shelter. It is also meant to reduce the strain on the city's hospital emergency rooms by providing services and identifying health problems before they escalate into emergencies. It was funded by $3 million in grants from the American Recovery and Reinvestment Act of 2009, Massachusetts Department of Housing and Community Development (DHCD), the Massachusetts Medical Society, and Alliance Charitable Foundation, and the United States Department of Health and Human Services Substance Abuse and Mental Health Services Administration (SAMHSA).

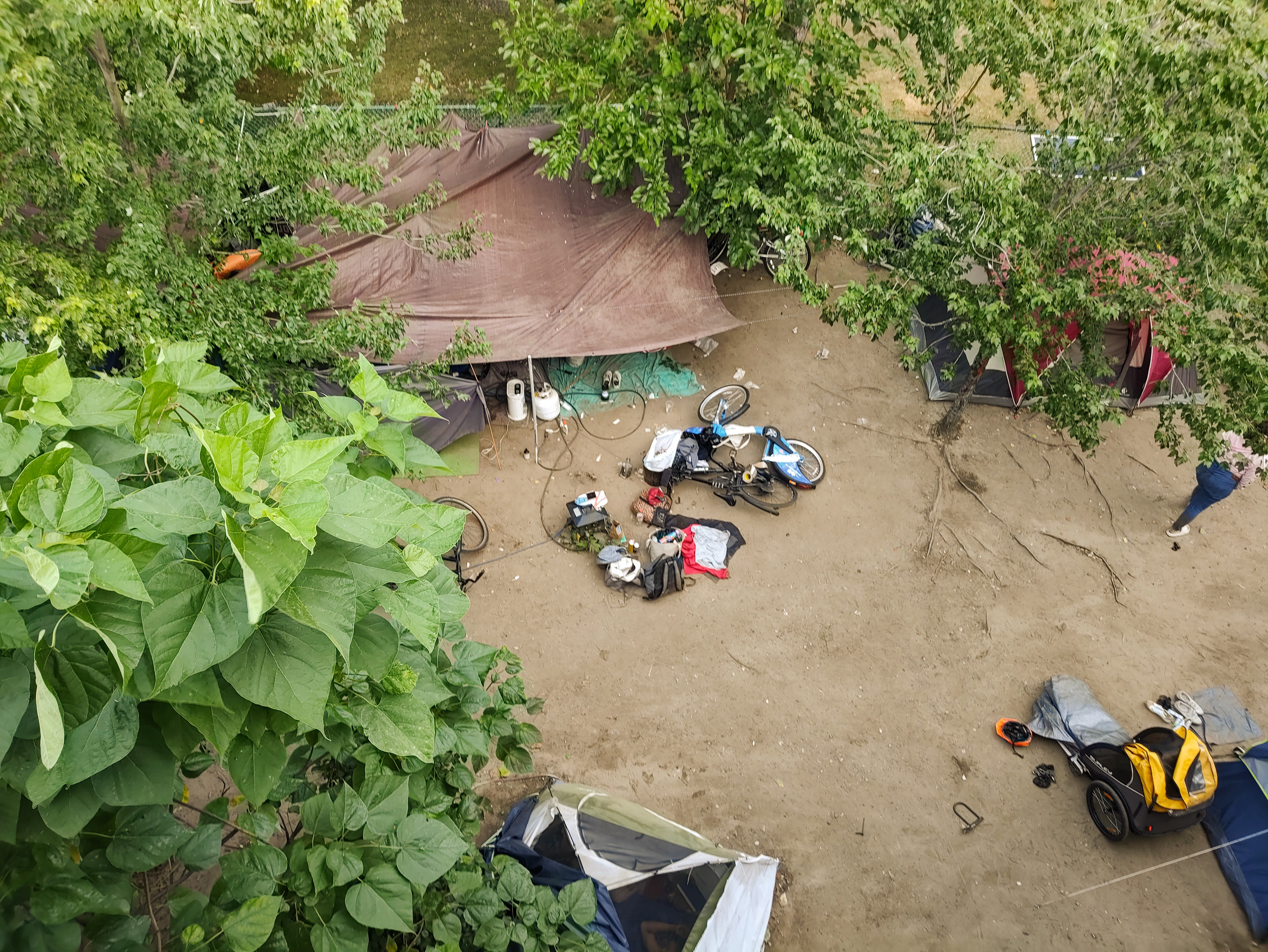
A homeless encampment adjacent to the Boston University Bridge in Cambridge, Massachusetts.

In 2010, there was a continued crackdown on panhandling in downtown Boston, especially the aggressive type. Summonses were being handed out with scheduled court appearances. The results were mixed, and in one upscale neighborhood, Beacon Hill, the resolve of the Beacon Hill Civic Association, which has received only one complaint about panhandlers, was to try to solve the bigger problem, not by criminal actions.

Due to economic constraints in 2010, Governor Deval Patrick had to cut the Commonwealth of Massachusetts 2011 budget so dental care for the majority of adults, including most homeless people, covered by MassHealth (Medicaid) would no longer be provided except for cleaning and extractions, with no fillings, dentures, or restorative care. This does not affect dental care for children. The measure took effect in July 2010 and affects an estimated 700,000 adults, including 130,000 seniors.

In September 2010, it was reported that the Housing First Initiative had significantly reduced the chronic homeless single-person population in Boston, Massachusetts, although homeless families were still increasing. Some shelters were reducing the number of beds due to lowered numbers of homeless, and some emergency shelter facilities were closing, especially the emergency Boston Night Center.

There is sometimes corruption and theft by the employees of a shelter, as evidenced by a 2011 investigative report by FOX 25 TV in Boston wherein several Boston public shelter employees were found stealing large amounts of food over some time from the shelter's kitchen for their private use and catering.

In October 2017, Boston Mayor Marty Walsh announced the hire of a full-time outreach manager for the Boston Public Library (BPL), whose focus would be to work with staff to provide assessment, crisis intervention, and intensive case management services to homeless individuals who frequent the library. The position is currently based at BPL's Central Library in Copley Square and is funded through the City of Boston's Department of Neighborhood Development and the Boston Public Library, and managed in partnership with Pine Street Inn.

The 2020 COVID-19 pandemic caused economic hardship for many residents, resulting in housing precarity and even homelessness for some.

== Vital statistics ==
| Year | Population | Live births | Deaths | Natural change | Crude birth rate (per 1,000) | Crude death rate (per 1,000) | Natural change (per 1,000) | Crude migration change (per 1,000) |
|---|---|---|---|---|---|---|---|---|
| 2000 | 6,361,104 | 81,614 | 56,681 | 24,933 | 12.8 | 8.9 | 3.9 | |
| 2001 | 6,397,634 | 81,077 | 56,754 | 24,323 | 12.7 | 8.9 | 3.8 | 1.9 |
| 2002 | 6,417,206 | 80,645 | 56,928 | 23,717 | 12.6 | 8.9 | 3.7 | -0.6 |
| 2003 | 6,422,565 | 80,184 | 56,291 | 23,893 | 12.5 | 8.8 | 3.7 | -2.9 |
| 2004 | 6,412,281 | 78,484 | 54,511 | 23,973 | 12.2 | 8.5 | 3.7 | -5.3 |
| 2005 | 6,403,290 | 76,865 | 53,874 | 22,991 | 12.0 | 8.4 | 3.6 | -5.0 |
| 2006 | 6,410,084 | 77,676 | 53,450 | 24,226 | 12.1 | 8.3 | 3.8 | -2.7 |
| 2007 | 6,431,559 | 77,967 | 52,917 | 25,050 | 12.1 | 8.2 | 3.9 | -0.6 |
| 2008 | 6,468,967 | 77,022 | 53,518 | 23,504 | 11.9 | 8.3 | 3.6 | 2.1 |
| 2009 | 6,517,613 | 75,016 | 52,308 | 22,708 | 11.5 | 8.0 | 3.5 | 4.0 |
| 2010 | 6,569,724 | 72,865 | 52,583 | 20,282 | 11.1 | 8.0 | 3.1 | 4.8 |
| 2011 | 6,630,673 | 73,166 | 53,710 | 19,456 | 11.0 | 8.1 | 2.9 | 6.3 |
| 2012 | 6,693,932 | 72,439 | 53,177 | 19,262 | 10.8 | 7.9 | 2.9 | 6.6 |
| 2013 | 6,757,991 | 71,788 | 54,567 | 17,221 | 10.6 | 8.1 | 2.5 | 6.9 |
| 2014 | 6,820,869 | 71,908 | 55,200 | 16,708 | 10.5 | 8.1 | 2.4 | 6.8 |
| 2015 | 6,866,661 | 71,492 | 57,806 | 13,686 | 10.4 | 8.4 | 2.0 | 4.7 |
| 2016 | 6,909,664 | 71,317 | 56,961 | 14,356 | 10.3 | 8.2 | 2.1 | 4.1 |
| 2017 | 6,959,114 | 70,702 | 58,803 | 11,899 | 10.2 | 8.4 | 1.7 | 5.4 |
| 2018 | 6,994,446 | 69,109 | 59,152 | 9,957 | 9.9 | 8.5 | 1.4 | 3.6 |
| 2019 | 7,016,781 | 69,117 | 58,630 | 10,487 | 9.9 | 8.4 | 1.5 | 1.7 |
| 2020 | 6,985,320 | 66,428 | 68,223 | -1,795 | 9.5 | 9.8 | -0.3 | -4.2 |
| 2021 | 6,996,721 | 69,137 | 63,115 | 6,022 | 9.9 | 9.0 | 0.9 | 0.8 |
| 2022 | 7,025,465 | 68,584 | 63,366 | 5,218 | 9.8 | 9.0 | 0.8 | 3.3 |
| 2023 | 7,073,479 | 67,093 | 61,171 | 5,922 | 9.5 | 8.6 | 0.9 | 6.0 |
| 2024 | 7,138,560 | 68,184 | 59,972 | 8,212 | 9.6 | 8.4 | 1.2 | 8.0 |
| 2025 | 7,154,084 | 67,537 | 59,956 | 7,581 | 9.4 | 8.4 | 1.0 | 1.1 |
