= History of Marshfield, Massachusetts =

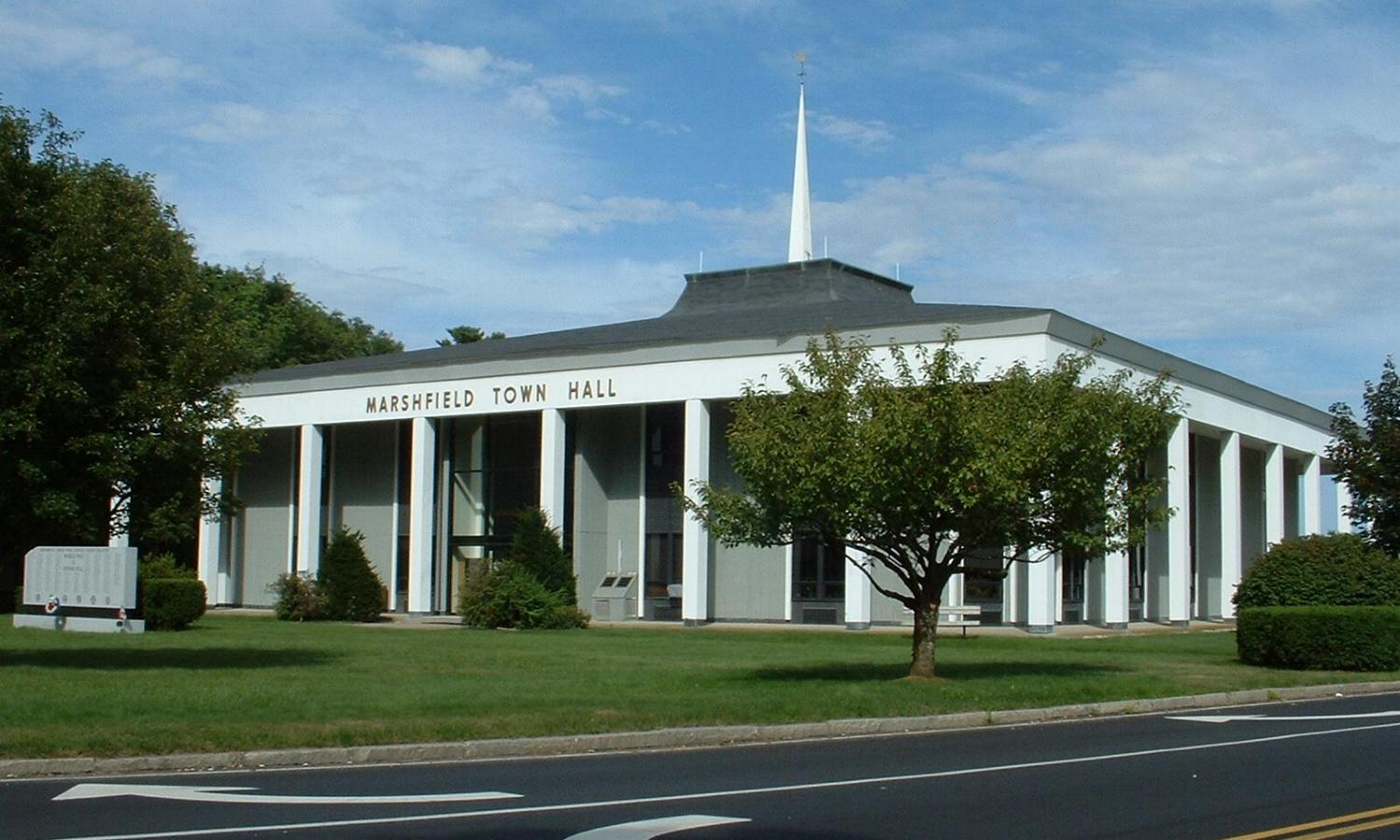
The modern Marshfield Town Hall, located near the southern merger of Routes 3A and 139, Marshfield, Massachusetts.

== History ==
=== Native tribes ===
Native Americans lived in Marshfield for thousands of years before the white traders and settlers arrived in what is today considered coastal Massachusetts. These people included members of the Wampanoag Tribe of the Algonquin nation and members of the Massachusetts Tribe. Evidence of Native American habitation extending back to 9,000 to 10,000 B.C. has been found extensively in the area; it is possible that there are even older human settlements in the area, but these are submerged due to rising sea levels since the early Holocene.

Native American roads were well established in the town by the time of English settlement in the 17th century. These Native American roads are still in use today, comprising the town's main roads. A pre-historic Native American road—extending between three rivers—can still be seen today in good condition. It is in woodlands formerly owned by the Marshfield Drive-In Movie Theatre.

The Wampanoag name for the area is "Missacautucket." The earliest English settlers became allies of the Wampanoags, due in part to a strong friendship formed between Chief Massasoit and Edward Winslow. That alliance lasted 40 years.

After Massasoit's death in 1661, his son Wamsutta succeeded him as Sachem of the Wampanoags. However, Wamsutta died under suspicious circumstances in 1662. After a visit to the home of Governor Josiah Winslow in Marshfield he suddenly collapsed and died. Wamsutta was succeeded as Sachem by his brother Metacomet, who was known to the English as King Philip. Metacomet grew increasingly resentful of the colonists after the mysterious death of his brother. These resentments led to King Philip's War. Governor Josiah Winslow of Marshfield commanded the colonial forces against the Native Americans during that brutal war. While nearby towns, including adjoining Scituate, were attacked during King Philip's War, Marshfield was spared. Subsequent to the victory of the colonists in King Philip's War, Native Americans had a limited presence in Marshfield.

=== Pilgrim settlement ===
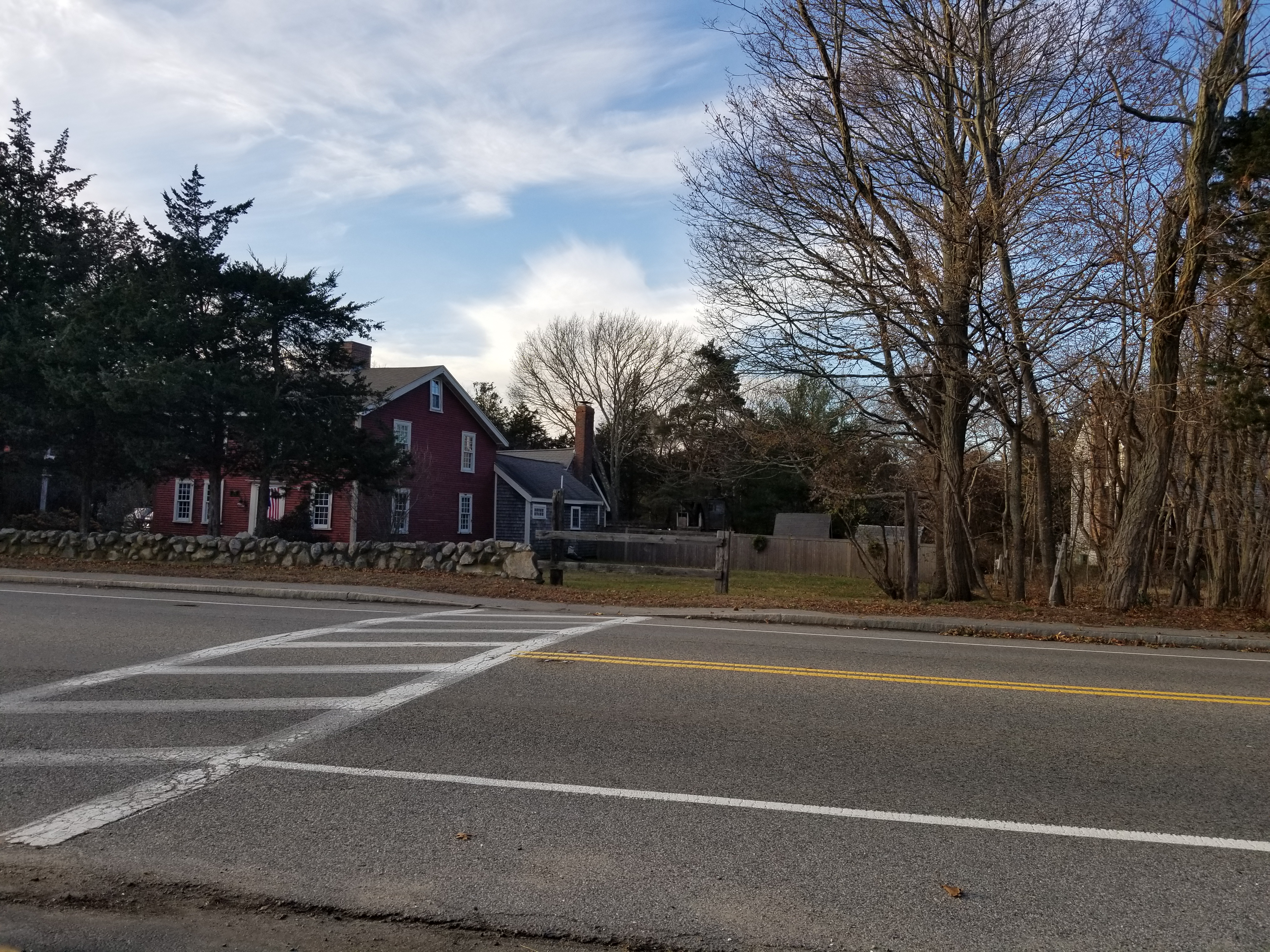
The Thomas Bourne House at 1308 Ocean Street is believed to date from 1637 or 1639.

Marshfield is an early Pilgrim town, originally part of the "New Colony of New Plimoth in New England," which was established in 1620. Marshfield retains some of its historic character throughout its several quaint villages.

Marshfield was first established as a separate settlement in 1632 by Edward Winslow, a Mayflower Pilgrim who became a governor of Plymouth Colony. Edward Winslow was the third signatory to the Mayflower Compact. He became a negotiator and diplomat for the Colony in its dealings with the Native Americans and with the British. Edward Winslow established the first church and the first school in the town, near the cemetery which today still bears the Winslow name.

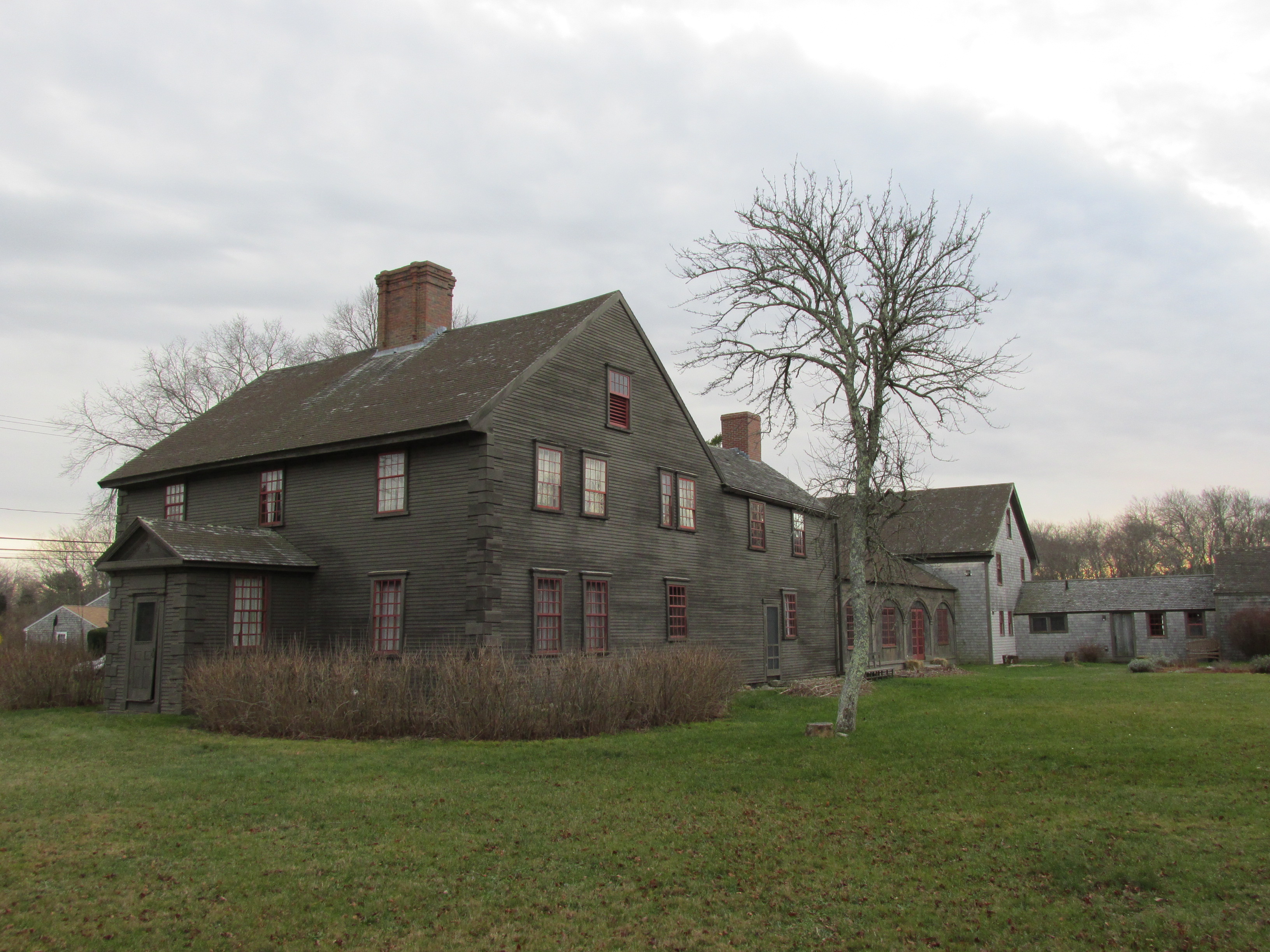
The Isaac Winslow House, ca 1699, the ancestral home of the founding family of Marshfield, was built on land owned by Governor Edward Winslow, who established the original homestead there. Virtually untouched by modernization, the house has been home to a long string of governors, generals, doctors, lawyers and judges who helped create Marshfield.

Governor Winslow was the author of several works concerning Plimoth Colony, which are now considered among the most important primary source materials about Plimoth still in existence. These include Good Newes from New England (1624); Hypocrisie Unmasked (1646),; New England's Salamander Discovered (1647); and The Glorious Progress of the Gospel Amongst The Indians of New England (1649). It is believed that he also wrote Mourt's Relation with William Bradford in 1622, although he did not sign the work.

Governor Edward Winslow made a major contribution to the success of Plimoth Plantation by returning to England to obtain cattle for the Colony. Cattle farming was introduced into Marshfield at the inception of its settlement and became a major industry for the town for the next 300 years. Governor Bradford described the first land grants in the Town as being made for tillage and cattle.

A commercial fishing enterprise was established in Marshfield by 1623, by William Green, who later married a granddaughter of Pilgrim Richard Warren. The area was originally referred to as "Green's Harbor." When the area was formally set off as a town, it was named "Rexhame." Later, the name of the town was changed to "Marshfield." The town has extensive acreage of salt water tidal marshes along its three rivers: the Green Harbor River, the South River and the North River. Hence the name "Marshfield".

Marshfield was officially set off from Plimoth Plantation as a separate "town" in 1640. Much of the land in Marshfield was originally granted to Pilgrims, their family members or to the investors in the Pilgrim settlement at Plymouth.

According to the List of Freemen of 1643, the earliest settlers in Marshfield, in addition to Edward Winslow, included his brothers Kenelm Winslow and Josiah Winslow. The list also included Thomas Bourne, Robert Waterman, John Dingley, Thomas Chillingsworth, John Russell, Edward Buckley, William Sherman, William Thomas and Nathaniel Thomas. (According to William Thomas' will, dated 9 July 1651, he was the father of Nathaniel Thomas).

The list of those who took the Oath of Fidelity in the Town in 1657 includes John Adams, John Booth, John Howland, Jr., Thomas Dogget, Samuel Baker, Robert Latham, Joseph Rose, Edward Bumpas, Jr., John Branch, James Dougherty, Robert Parker, Edmund Hincksman, Richard Sylvester, Thomas Tilden, Francis Crocker, John Thomas, Abraham Jackson, John Thomas, John Rogers, Jr., John Walker, George Vaughan, William Foard, Jr., William Maycomber, Richard French, Ralph Chapman, John Bumpas, and Grigory Flecnam.

=== Pilgrim Peregrine White ===
An early resident of the town was Peregrine White, the first English child born in New England. Peregrine was born on November 20, 1620, on the Mayflower, while the ship was anchored near Provincetown on Cape Cod. This is where the Pilgrims moored for several weeks prior to selecting a location in Plymouth for permanent settlement. Peregrine was born to Pilgrim Susanna (Unknown) White and her husband Pilgrim William White. William died during the first winter. Half of the Pilgrims died that winter due to sickness, cold and starvation.

The name "Peregrine" means "wanderer", "foreign traveler", or "pilgrim." After Peregrine's father died, his mother Susanna White married Edward Winslow in 1621. Winslow's first wife, Elizabeth Barker Winslow, also had perished that initial winter. Susanna was the first English bride married in New England. She was also the first English woman to give birth in New England.

Pilgrims Susanna, Edward and Peregrine all settled in Marshfield, along with Susanna's older son, Pilgrim Resolved White. Edward Winslow adopted Susanna's two son's as his own. The General Court of Plimoth Colony granted Edward Winslow a large tract of land, about 1,200 acres (4.9 km^{2}), covering much of Marshfield south of the Green Harbor River. This is where Peregrine was raised.

After he married, Peregrine eventually established a successful farm. It was on the western bank of the South River, directly across the river from the farm of Kenelm Winslow, Edward's brother. Yet, Peregrine could be seen almost daily on his horse riding to see his mother Susanna at Green Harbor, with the silver buttons on his jacket twinkling in the sunlight. He was of high energy and described as "comely to the last." Peregrine became widely known for planting a great number of European fruit trees in Marshfield and other parts of the Colony. He held a number of offices in Marshfield and the Colony, including the office of Selectman of Marshfield. Peregrine also served as a lieutenant in the Colony's militia. He lived until age 84, passing on July 20, 1704. Peregrine White was much revered within the Colony as the first born.

Peregrine White's baby cradle, the first cradle of New England births, has been preserved since 1620. The cradle can be seen today on display at Pilgrim Hall in nearby Plymouth.

=== Land tenure ===
For purposes of settling in the area peacefully, Josiah Winslow secured a deed to the town from the Chief of the Massachusett Tribe, Chickatawbut. Chief Chickatawbut granted land rights to the English settlers from Plymouth on the condition that members of the Massachusett Tribe could continue to hunt and fish in the area in perpetuity.

In the earliest years of the town, many of the land grants given by the Plymouth Colony Court were held by investors or speculators who did not live in the town, and frequently swapped and traded their deeds. The settlement of the town was largely confined to the area south of the South River.

There was extensive "common land" in the town, not owned by any individual. Some of the land in the town remains "common land" today, such as the town's magnificent five mile (8 km) long seashore along the Atlantic Ocean. In the case of Briggs Thomas v. Inhabitants of Marshfield, 13 Pickering 240 (1832), the Supreme Judicial Court ruled that the Marshfield seashore was a public highway and landing place. The Court further ruled that the Marshfield seashore, including extensive beach dunes, had been set aside for use as a common for hundreds of years. In connection with that litigation, it was determined that the owner of the farm along some of the beach, Major Briggs Thomas, did not own the beautiful Rexhame Beach, as he claimed, and that Rexhame Beach was part of the common land of the town.

=== Colonial government ===
Plymouth Colony was governed by a Governor and a General Court, composed of freemen of the Colony. The term "freemen" included white males, and excluded all women, Native Americans, blacks, indentured servants, Quakers and other religious minorities. In 1685, Plymouth Colony was divided into counties. Marshfield was designated part of Plymouth County. Marshfield did not become part of Massachusetts until 1692, when the English Crown forced the Pilgrim's Plymouth Colony to merge with the Massachusetts Bay Colony, which was seated to the north in Boston.

The 1692 charter created the Province of Massachusetts. The charter joined Plymouth's government with the Massachusetts Bay government, and created a single legislature. The Province of the Massachusetts Bay was replaced by a provisional government called the Massachusetts Provincial Congress during the American Revolution. After the American Revolution, the provisional government became the "State of Massachusetts" which later evolved into the Commonwealth of Massachusetts.

Up until the time of the merger of the two colonies, Plymouth Colony was distinctly different from the Massachusetts Bay Colony. For example, the Pilgrims of Plymouth Colony did not embrace the death penalty or physical mutilation as punishment for crimes, while the colony at Massachusetts frequently employed such punishments. The two colonies were controlled by members of different religions. Plymouth Colony was established by Separatists, while the Massachusetts colony was established by Puritans. The two colonies had different sets of laws. Plymouth Colony demonstrated greater religious tolerance. Neither Marshfield nor Plymouth Colony was involved in the Massachusetts witchcraft hysteria, which erupted simultaneously with the merger of the two colonies, and resulted in the Salem witch trials.

=== American Revolution ===
==== Pilgrim loyalty ====
In the days of the American Revolution, Marshfield was considered a main hotbed of Tory activity, the most Loyalist town in New England. Although not everyone in the town was a Loyalist, Marshfield was unique in Massachusetts in that for a long while the Loyalists dominated and controlled the town, rather than existing merely as a minority faction.

At the time, the Town had a population of about 1,200 residents, some of whom were considered to be very wealthy. The population was still largely descended from the town's founding families, including the descendants of Pilgrim Edward Winslow, Pilgrim Peregrine White, Pilgrim Resolved White and Pilgrim Richard Warren. These and other Old Colony families within the town had intermarried for generations. Oftentimes, one distant cousin married another distant cousin. The townspeople were closely bound together by an all encompassing web of blood ties.

Some of these families had for generations educated their sons at Harvard College. They were connected with powerful figures in the royal government of the Massachusetts Colony. Members of the Winslow family in particular were part of the aristocracy of Massachusetts, which also was tightly bound together by intermarriage. A number of families in the town were members of the Episcopal Church, which up until the Revolution was part of the Church of England.

Many of these families were alienated by the extreme violence, including the use of tarring and feathering, which characterized the behavior of the Patriots. Contrary to popular myth, the Massachusetts Patriots showed no regard for rights of free speech, or rights of free assembly, or the right to simply hold different views. A fact now buried in time is that the Patriots set out to win by intimidating those who held Loyalist views through mobbings and assaults. In one example, Patriots on Cape Cod acted to silence a woman who dared to express her Loyalist views to her customers in her small grocery store. A mob of Patriot men broke into the home of a widow named Abigail Freeman during the night. They dragged her from her bed to the town green and there tarred and feathered her. They then carted her around town on a rail.

The Loyalist families tended to hold the view that favorable concessions could be won from Britain through diplomacy, rather than by extremism and threats of a violent rebellion. They considered themselves Englishmen, subjects of the King. The Winslow family in particular retained strong ties to England due to General John Winslow's long and distinguished service in the provincial forces of the British Army.

Winslow relative Nathaniel Ray Thomas was a prominent Loyalist in the town. In August 1774, Thomas was appointed by General Thomas Gage, royal governor of the Province of Massachusetts, and the King's Privy Council to the position of Mandamus Councillor. On September 6, 1774, a large Patriot mob of over a thousand men from Plymouth, Kingston, Pembroke, Hanover and Scituate began assembling to march to Thomas's home to demand his resignation from the post. The Patriots took the position that those accepting appointments as Mandamus Councillors were enemies of the cause of liberty. The mob arrived the next day, September 7, carrying an empty coffin. However, Thomas had been tipped off to the plans of the mob forming in Plymouth. Thomas had already escaped by fleeing on horseback along the beach under cover of night on September 6, 1774. Thomas reached the relative safety of British occupied Boston. For Marshfield, the Revolution had already begun.

==== Associated Loyalists of Marshfield ====
In December 1774, Marshfield residents formed a Loyalist militia named the "Associated Loyalists of Marshfield." The membership has been described as numbering about 300, comprising the majority of adult males in the town. However, other sources indicate that there were hundreds more affiliated with the group and that "all but six" of the Marshfield men were members of the group. The formation of the group brought hope to the royal government that more Massachusetts towns would follow the Marshfield example of adopting a strong Loyalist position.

The "Associated Loyalists" concept was conceived by Winslow descendant Timothy Ruggles of Hardwick to counter the efforts of the Patriots under the Continental Association. The Marshfield group signed the so-called "Ruggles Covenant"- a pledge to oppose the formation of any congress within the colonies, to remain loyal to the king, and to defend their principles at risk to their own lives.

Ruggles, who served as a Mandamus Councillor along with Nathaniel Ray Thomas of Marshfield and Isaac Winslow of Boston, intended the Associated Loyalists to become a statewide group to serve as a Tory military force throughout Massachusetts. A number of Loyalists in Freetown, MA, led by members of the Winslow family and their relatives, signed the Ruggles Covenant. However, Marshfield was the only town with a substantial number signing the pledge. Later, Marshfield became one of the few Massachusetts towns to take formal action at its Town Meeting to oppose the Patriots' formation of the Provincial Congress.

The Associated Loyalists of Marshfield held their meetings at the Marshfield mansion of Dr. Isaac Winslow, today known as the Historic 1699 Winslow House. At the time of the formation of the group in 1774, all three members of the Marshfield Board of Selectmen were loyalists, Isaac Winslow, Abijah White and Ephraim Little. The Plymouth Patriots were threatening to tar and feather those in Marshfield who did not recant their Loyalist views, or drive them off their farms. Patriots from Duxbury planned to kidnap Marshfield resident Nathaniel Phillips, a "principal loyalist," but he evaded capture. The Patriots did kidnap Marshfield Loyalists Paul White, Dr. Stockbridge and Elisha Ford, and carted them to the "Liberty Pole" in Duxbury. There they were "forced to sign recantations" of their Tory sentiments, likely in response to mob violence.

In January 1775, the Associated Loyalists of Marshfield sent a petition signed by 200 people to General Gage, commander of the British troops in Boston, requesting that arms and troops be sent to Marshfield for the protection of the Loyalists in the town.

==== British occupation ====
To aid the Associated Loyalists, on January 23, 1775 General Gage sent Captain Nesbitt Balfour and numerous officers leading 114 troops of the regiment known as the "King's Own." They arrived on two armed schooners, the Dianna and the Britannia, of the fleet of Admiral Samuel Graves. General Gage also sent 300 stands of arms and two cannons.

After the ships landed at White's Ferry, the troops marched south into the center of the town without meeting resistance. The troops were quartered on the 1,500-acre (6.1 km^{2}) estate of Nathaniel Ray Thomas and other private Loyalist homes in Marshfield. Captain Balfour placed the troops at the disposal of town authorities for purposes of keeping order. The troops were to be stationed in the town indefinitely.

In a letter from a Marshfield Loyalist printed in the Rivington's New York Gazette dated February 9, 1775, it was reported that the British troops were "joyfully received" by Loyalists in Marshfield. The letter stated: "The king's troops are very comfortably accommodated, and preserve the most exact discipline, and now every faithful subject to his king dare freely utter his thoughts, drink his tea and kill his sheep, as profusely as he pleases.".

On February 20, 1775, Marshfield's Town Meeting voted to repudiate the authority of the Patriot's Provincial Congress. The Town Meeting also voted to express its gratitude to General Gage and Admiral Graves by sending formal letters of thanks. The town received from General Gage and Admiral Graves the following responses:

To the Loyal Inhabitants of the Town of Marshfield.

Gentlemen,-I return to you my most hearty thanks for your address, and am to assure you, that I feel great satisfaction in having contributed to the safety and protection of a people so eminent for their Loyalty to their King, and affection to their country at a time, when Treason and Rebellion is making such hasty strides to overturn our most excellent constitution and spread Ruin and Desolation thro' the Province.

I doubt not that your duty to your God, your King and your country will excite you to persevere in the Glorious Cause in which you are engaged, and that your laudable example will animate others with the like Loyal and Patriotic Spirit. Thomas Gage.

Admiral Graves replied as follows:

To The Inhabitants of the Town of Marshfield.

Gentlemen,- The warmth with which you declare your principles of Loyalty to your Sovereign and his Constitutional Government cannot fail of being grateful to the mind of every lover of his country: and it is much to be wished that the uniform propriety of your conduct will extend its influence to the removal of those groundless jealousies, which have unhappily warped the affections of too many of your countrymen from the parent state, and which are now tending to raise violent commotions, and involve in Ruin and Destruction this unfortunate Province.

The approbation you are pleased to express of his Majesty's appointment at this critical juncture to the command of his American fleet, is flattering; and you may be assured that my countenance and support shall never be wanting to protect the Friends of British Government and reduce to order and submission, those who would endeavor to destroy that Peace and Harmony, which is the end of good Legislation to produce. Samuel Graves.

This troop movement was also the subject of a letter from General Gage to Lord Dartmouth dated January 27, 1775, which was read to the British Parliament on March 8, 1775.

The day after the Lexington Alarm of April 19, 1775, approximately one thousand Patriot militia from the local towns of Plymouth, Kingston, Duxbury, Carver, Plympton, Middleboro and Rochester stormed into Marshfield—to attack the British soldiers quartered within the town and the Tories hosting them. Colonel Anthony Thomas, a Patriot leader, helped to coordinate the incursion by assembling several hundred militia forces at his house in preparation for the attack on the estate of his own neighbor, Nathaniel Ray Thomas. The first troops to arrive decided to wait until the next day, so that more Patriot troops could amass for the Marshfield battle.

The confrontation with the British was narrowly averted when Admiral Graves sent the HM Schooner Hope along with two wooden sloops to evacuate the British troops and the Tories at Marshfield. The ships came in near Brant Rock at the Cut River. The two sloops had been "prest" into service by Admiral Graves as the first British "prizes" of the Revolutionary War. Marshfield men alerted the British troops to the arrival of the ships by firing guns from atop "Signal Hill" situated within the vast lands of the Thomas estate. Over one hundred Loyalist residents of the area evacuated with the British troops to Boston. Some of these residents joined regiments in Boston to aid the British. Other Marshfield Tories were taken prisoner by the militia from surrounding towns during the skirmish. The guns sent by General Gage for the Associated Loyalists were confiscated by the Patriots.

The British evacuation of Marshfield occurred just one day after the first battle of the Revolution at Lexington, Massachusetts. Edward Winslow, Jr. served as a guide for Britain's Lord Percy at the Lexington battle. His horse was shot under him during battle.

==== British military volunteers ====
During the war, Edward Winslow (loyalist), Junior served as the "Commander of the Associated Loyalists," in charge of Tory regiments. He was a direct descendant of Pilgrim Governor Edward Winslow and was the Plymouth first cousin of Dr. Isaac Winslow of Marshfield. He later held the position of "Muster-Master General of the Loyal North British Volunteers."

Another leader of the Loyalists' militia was Timothy Ruggles, a former general in the provincial forces under the British Army. Both Edward Winslow, Jr. and Timothy Ruggles were reported to have led Loyalists in acts of piracy to fund their military operations- using British privateers coasting along south Massachusetts.

Dr. Isaac Winslow's brother, Marshfield native Pelham Winslow, was a Major with the British forces. He was known as "Commander of Castle William." Castle William is today known as Fort Independence and is situated on Castle Island in South Boston. Pelham Winslow died of fever in 1783 in New York, where he was serving with the British forces.

Abijah White, a descendant of Pilgrim Peregrine White, was a Selectman of the town in 1774. He became Marshfield's representative in the Province legislature in 1775. He was wounded in a battle at sea near Boston Light while fighting alongside British forces. The battle occurred on July 30, 1775. The British forces, aided by Marshfield Tories, were attempting to repair Boston Light. They were attacked by Major Benjamin Tupper leading 20 whale boats and 200 Patriot forces. The Patriot forces shot Representative Abijah White in the back. He died not long afterwards. Four Marshfield Tories were taken prisoner.

Other Marshfield residents took up arms against the Patriots to fight for the British. Among these were Marshfield men who joined the "Loyal American Association, Fifth Company of Associators Militia," assembled in Boston on July 5, 1775: Joseph Tilden, John Tilden, Stephen Tilden, Silvanus White, Abijah White, Daniel White, Syballine White and Nathaniel Thomas. The Loyal American Association, First Company, then led by Timothy Ruggles and Edward Winslow, Jr., included Marshfield residents Seth Bryant and William Cowper. The Third Company of Associators of the Loyal American Association included Marshfield's Ephraim Little. The Fourth Company of Associators, also assembled in Boston on July 5, 1775, included Nathaniel Phillips and John Phillips Jr.

In July 1775, Patriot forces captured 13 Tories who were camped out on Long Island in Boston Harbor, where they had been harvesting hay for British troops. In a letter to her husband John Adams, the future First Lady Abigail Adams described the Tories as having been sent there by Marshfield's Nathaniel Ray Thomas.

Around this time in July 1775, General George Washington came to Massachusetts to take command of the Patriot forces. His headquarters were in Cambridge.

The first arrest of a Tory on Washington's orders during the American Revolution was carried out at the Kenelm Winslow house in Marshfield. This is the ancient house built by the original Kenelm Winslow about 1640, located on Winslow Street in Rexhame, at the corner of Kenelm Drive. At the time, the house was owned by a descendant, Kenelm Winslow, who was then a Marshfield Selectman. It is not known who was arrested in the house. However, Kenelm's brother Joseph Winslow, who had also grown up in the house, was a tea importer in Boston. He was accused of engaging in efforts to aid the British.

In November 1775, Nathaniel Phillips, a former Selectman of Marshfield, was sent to General Washington as "an infamous Tory." Nathaniel Phillips was sentenced to house arrest from 1775 to 1783.

==== The Diaspora of the Marshfield loyalists ====
After the British evacuated from Boston on March 17, 1776, a number of Marshfield residents were banished from the state under the Tory Banishment Act. The Marshfield Tories were met with mobbings, assaults, jailings, land confiscations and banishments. Many of the Marshfield Tories fled Massachusetts. Some never returned. Others eventually did return after they felt it was safe to do so. In April 1776, the town of Milton denied a ship carrying Marshfield Tories returning from Nova Scotia permission to land, presumably along the Neponset River. The ship "Sally", commanded by Loyalist Captain Cornelius White, with numerous Marshfield Tories on board, landed along the North River on April 19, 1776. The ship contained many articles consistent with the ship having been used for warfare, including 17 firearms, 5 bayonets, swords, 8 powder horns, hanger and cartridge boxes. The returning Tories had originally left with the British troops when they evacuated Marshfield on April 20, 1775. All on board were taken to jail by the local Committee of Correspondence.

The anguished dilemma facing the Loyalist families at the conclusion of the war was poignantly expressed in a letter by Sarah Winslow of Plymouth to her cousin Benjamin Marston, dated April 10, 1783:

"Our fate now decreed, and we are left to mourn out our days in wretchedness. No other resources but to submit to the tyranny of exulting enemies or settle a new country. I am one of the number that gladly would embark for Nova Scotia was it either prudent or proper, but I am told it will not do for me at present. What is to become of us, God can only tell. In all our former suffering we had hope to support us--being deprived of that is too much."

Her father, Edward Winslow, a direct descendant of Pilgrim Governor Edward Winslow, tried to reside in Plymouth after the British Evacuation but was driven out. He explained to the Commission on American Loyalists sitting in Halifax, Canada on October 23, 1783: "I was the butt of the licentious, and had received every species of insult and abuse, which the utmost rancour and malice could invent."

His son, Edward Winslow (loyalist), the Tory military leader, was banished from the state. He helped to found the Loyalist colony in New Brunswick. Many families relocated to New Brunswick, Nova Scotia, Halifax and other places in Canada and Maine. Of those from Plymouth County who fled, the vast majority were from Marshfield. The loss or displacement of so many residents and working farms, and the disruption to businesses, resulted in the greatest transformation of Marshfield since the time of the arrival of the Pilgrims, led by Governor Edward Winslow.

==== The Marshfield Tea Party ====
But not everyone in Marshfield was a Loyalist. Despite the powerful influence of the Loyalist families, the town's Patriots eventually formed one of the revolutionary Committees of Correspondence. Marshfield native John Thomas (general), who lived in Kingston, raised an army of volunteers from Plymouth County for the Continental Army on April 23, 1775, known as the 2nd Massachusetts Regiment, also known as the 23rd Continental Regiment. General John Thomas's regiment would see action during the Siege of Boston. He received a letter from General George Washington praising his service. Other Marshfield Patriot leaders included his brother, Colonel Anthony Thomas, his nephew, Major Briggs Thomas and John Bourne.

Marshfield even had its own version of the Boston Tea Party. At midnight on December 19, 1773, Marshfield Patriots confiscated tea from the old Ordinary in the town as a protest against the Crown and in sympathy with the Boston Tea Party, which had just taken place. The Ordinary is a building still standing today, which was constructed as a tavern in 1673 by Timothy Williamson. It is located at 2000 Ocean Street at the corner with Moraine Street (today known as The Corner Cafe). In 1773 the building was owned by John Bourne. After taking the tea, the Patriots knelt in prayer and ceremoniously burnt the tea on a large rock, situated on what became known as "Tea Rock Hill".

The Marshfield Patriots finally had their day when, on June 19, 1776, the Town Meeting voted to support independence and to defend the effort with their lives. This preceded the national Declaration of Independence by fifteen days.

The legacy of the past lives on in the town today, largely through silence. Unlike other area towns, Marshfield had no written history book until the 20th century. As far back as can be remembered, Marshfield's official July 4 celebrations have been far more subdued than those of surrounding towns. Many years, the town was noteworthy for not having July 4 celebrations at all, in contrast to most other towns. The Marshfield Tea Party serves as the town's only symbol of its Revolutionary past, reflective of the town's continuing uneasiness with its breathtaking Loyalist history.

=== Overview ===
Early industry in the town included farming, cattle, fishing and salt marsh haying. A number of the town's early families held people as slaves, including the Winslow family at Green Harbor, as well as the Winslow and Kent families at Rexhame beach. Some of the ancient and beautiful stone walls along the fields and roads in Marshfield were likely built by people held as slaves by Marshfield families.

An early nail factory, founded by Jesse Reed, was one of the first to manufacture nails by machine. Shipbuilding grew in the town, and over 1,000 ships were built along the North River in town during the 19th century. The town is also the site of Brant Rock, where Reginald Fessenden built the antenna from which he sent his first transatlantic voice radio broadcast in 1907.

In 1941, a great conflagration engulfed the eastern part of the town. Approximately 400 buildings burnt down in three hours. This was one of the largest fires in terms of structures destroyed in the history of the United States. The tragedy was the subject of national news coverage, including photographic coverage in Life Magazine.

Today, Marshfield is largely a semi-rural and suburban town, with many residents commuting daily into Boston. Some of the old farms still remain, as well as a large number of historic houses. The town continues to have a large summer resort population. The Marshfield Fair continues on as the oldest agricultural fair in the United States and serves as the highlight of summer activities in the town. The beach and sea remain largely as they have always been,- ever present, ever beautiful, the essence of Marshfield.
