= Outline of Massachusetts =

U.S. state

The flag of Massachusetts

The seal of Massachusetts

The location of the Commonwealth of Massachusetts in the United States of America

The following outline is provided as an overview of and topical guide to the U.S. Commonwealth of Massachusetts:

Massachusetts – U.S. state in the New England region of the northeastern United States of America. It is bordered by Rhode Island and Connecticut to the south, New York to the west, and Vermont and New Hampshire to the north; at its east lies the Atlantic Ocean. Approximately two-thirds of the state's population lives in Greater Boston, most of which is either urban or suburban. In the late 18th century, Boston became known as the "Cradle of Liberty" for the agitation there that led to the American Revolution and the independence of the United States from Great Britain. Massachusetts is also home to Harvard University, the oldest institution of higher learning in the U.S., founded in 1636.

== General reference ==
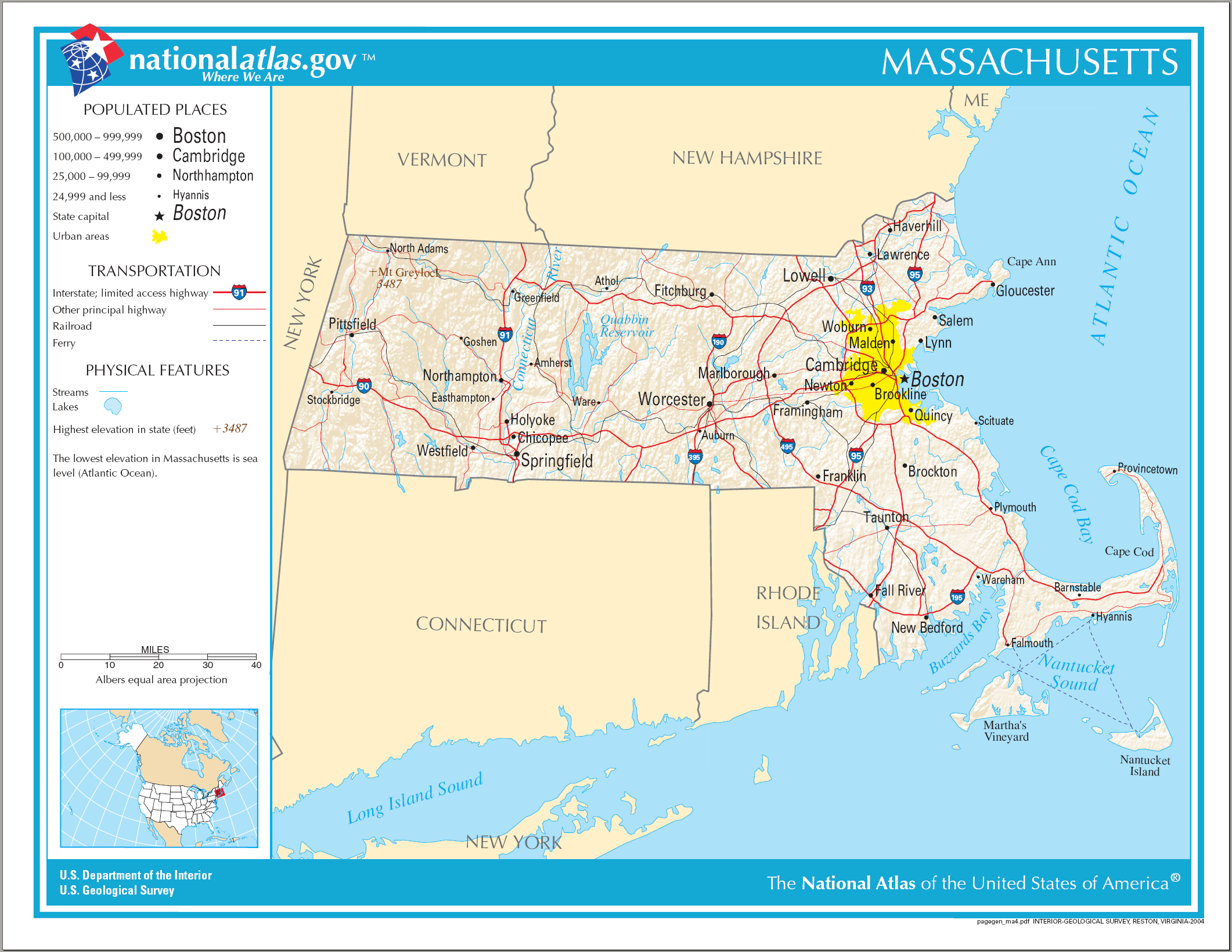
An enlargeable map of the Commonwealth of Massachusetts

- Names
  - Common name: Massachusetts
    - Pronunciation: /ˌmæsəˈtʃuːsɪts/
  - Official name: Commonwealth of Massachusetts
  - Abbreviations and name codes
    - Postal symbol: MA
    - ISO 3166-2 code: US-MA
    - Internet second-level domain: .ma.us
  - Nicknames
    - Baked Bean State
    - The Bay State
    - Old Colony State
    - Pilgrim State
    - The Spirit of America (currently used on license plates)
    - Taxachusetts (colloquial)
- Adjectival: Massachusetts
- Demonyms
  - Bay Stater
  - Massachusettsan
  - Massachusite
  - Masshole (derogatory; reclaimed)

== Geography of Massachusetts ==
Geography of Massachusetts

- Massachusetts is: a U.S. state, a federal state of the United States of America
- Location:
  - Northern Hemisphere
  - Western Hemisphere
    - Americas
      - North America
        - Anglo America
        - Northern America
          - United States of America
            - Contiguous United States
              - Eastern United States
                - East Coast of the United States
                  - Northeastern United States
                    - New England
                  - Northeast megalopolis
- Population of Massachusetts: 6,547,629 (2010 U.S. Census)
- Area of Massachusetts: 10,555 square miles (27,340 km^{2})
- Atlas of Massachusetts

=== Places in Massachusetts ===
- Historic places in Massachusetts
  - National Historic Landmarks in Massachusetts
  - National Register of Historic Places listings in Massachusetts
    - Bridges on the National Register of Historic Places in Massachusetts
- National Natural Landmarks in Massachusetts
- National parks in Massachusetts
- State parks in Massachusetts

=== Environment of Massachusetts ===
- Climate of Massachusetts
- Geology of Massachusetts
- Protected areas in Massachusetts
  - State forests of Massachusetts
- Superfund sites in Massachusetts
- Wildlife of Massachusetts
  - Fauna of Massachusetts
    - Amphibians of Massachusetts
    - Birds of Massachusetts
    - Mammals of Massachusetts
    - Reptiles of Massachusetts
- Natural Resource Protection Zoning

==== Natural geographic features of Massachusetts ====
- Islands of Massachusetts
- Mountains of Massachusetts
- Rivers of Massachusetts

=== Regions of Massachusetts ===
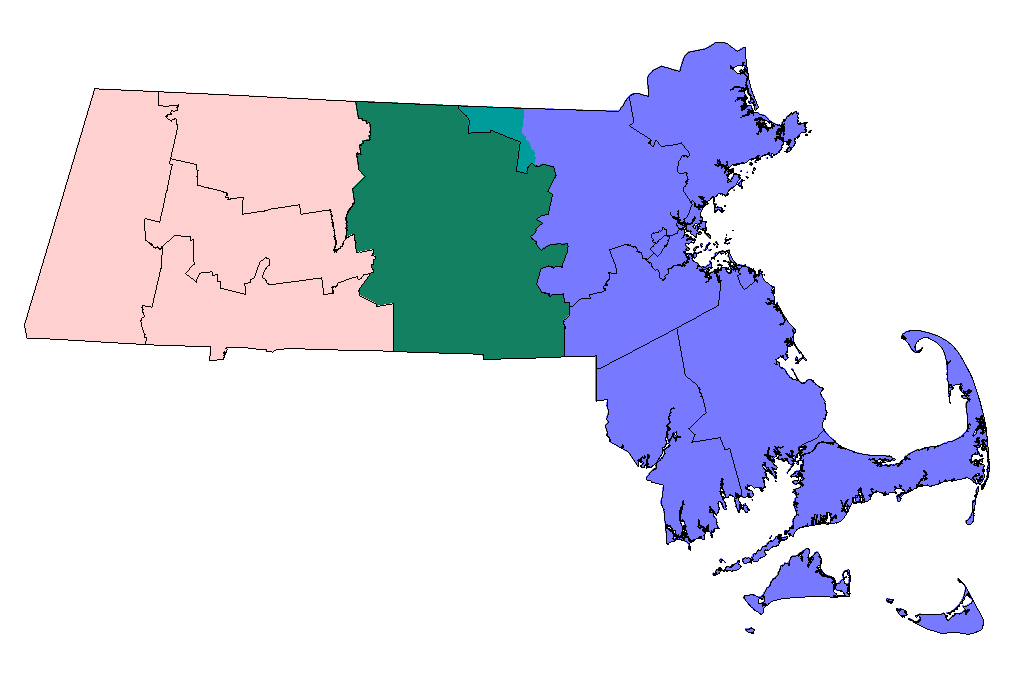
Massachusetts with three major regions highlighted: Central Massachusetts in green and teal (used to show towns in Middlesex County), Eastern Massachusetts in purple and Western Massachusetts in pink.

- Central Massachusetts includes Worcester County and far northwestern Middlesex County
  - Blackstone Valley
  - Montachusett-North County
  - South County
- Eastern Massachusetts includes Barnstable, Bristol, Dukes, Essex, most of Middlesex, Nantucket, Norfolk, Plymouth and Suffolk Counties
  - Central Eastern Massachusetts:
    - Greater Boston
    - MetroWest
  - Northern Eastern Massachusetts:
    - Cape Ann
    - Merrimack Valley
    - North Shore
  - Southern Eastern Massachusetts:
    - Cape Cod
    - South Shore
    - Southeastern Massachusetts (a locally named region that does not encompass the entire southeastern geographical area of the state)
    - South Coast
- Western Massachusetts includes Berkshire, Franklin, Hampden and Hampshire Counties
  - The Berkshires
  - Connecticut River Valley
  - Quabbin Valley

==== Administrative divisions of Massachusetts ====
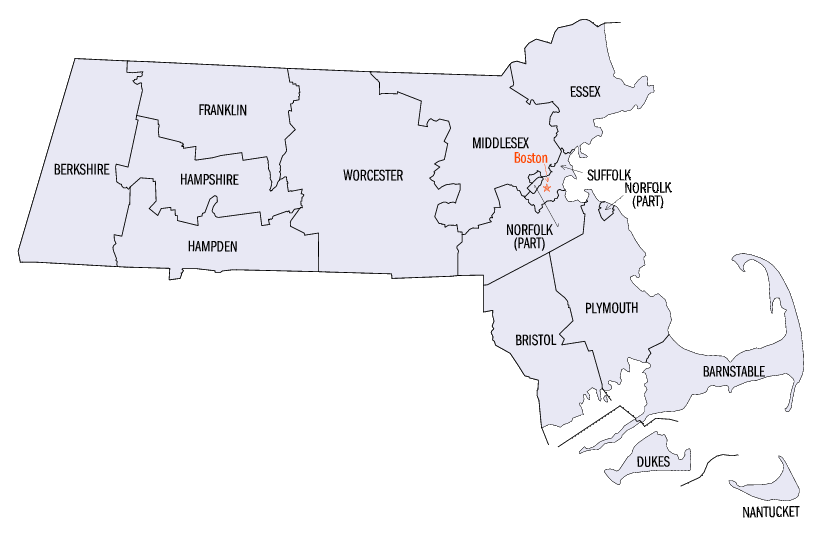
An enlargeable map of the 14 counties of the Commonwealth of Massachusetts

- The 14 Counties of the Commonwealth of Massachusetts
  - Barnstable County
  - Berkshire County
  - Bristol County
  - Dukes County
  - Essex County
  - Franklin County
  - Hampden County
  - Hampshire County
  - Middlesex County
  - Nantucket County
  - Norfolk County
  - Plymouth County
  - Suffolk County
  - Worcester County
- Municipalities in Massachusetts
  - Cities in Massachusetts
    - State capital of Massachusetts: Boston
    - City nicknames in Massachusetts
  - Towns in Massachusetts
  - Unincorporated communities in Massachusetts: There is no unincorporated territory in Massachusetts
- Census-designated places in Massachusetts

=== Demography of Massachusetts ===
Demographics of Massachusetts

== Government and politics of Massachusetts ==
Politics of Massachusetts

- Form of government: U.S. state government
- Massachusetts's congressional delegations
- Massachusetts State Capitol
- Elections in Massachusetts
  - Electoral reform in Massachusetts
- Political party strength in Massachusetts

=== Branches of the government of Massachusetts ===
Government of Massachusetts

==== Executive branch of the government of Massachusetts ====
- Governor of Massachusetts
  - Lieutenant Governor of Massachusetts
  - Secretary of State of Massachusetts
  - State Treasurer of Massachusetts
- State departments
  - Massachusetts Department of Transportation

==== Legislative branch of the government of Massachusetts ====
- Massachusetts General Court (bicameral)
  - Upper house: Massachusetts Senate
  - Lower house: Massachusetts House of Representatives

==== Judicial branch of the government of Massachusetts ====
Judiciary of Massachusetts

- Supreme Court of Massachusetts

=== Law and order in Massachusetts ===
Law of Massachusetts

- Cannabis in Massachusetts
- Capital punishment in Massachusetts
- Constitution of Massachusetts
- Crime in Massachusetts
- Gun laws in Massachusetts
- Law enforcement in Massachusetts
  - Law enforcement agencies in Massachusetts
    - Massachusetts State Police
- Same-sex marriage in Massachusetts

=== Military in Massachusetts ===
- Massachusetts Air National Guard
- Massachusetts Army National Guard

=== Local government in Massachusetts ===
Local government in Massachusetts

== History of Massachusetts ==
History of Massachusetts

=== History of Massachusetts, by period ===
The location of the Commonwealth of Massachusetts in the United States of America

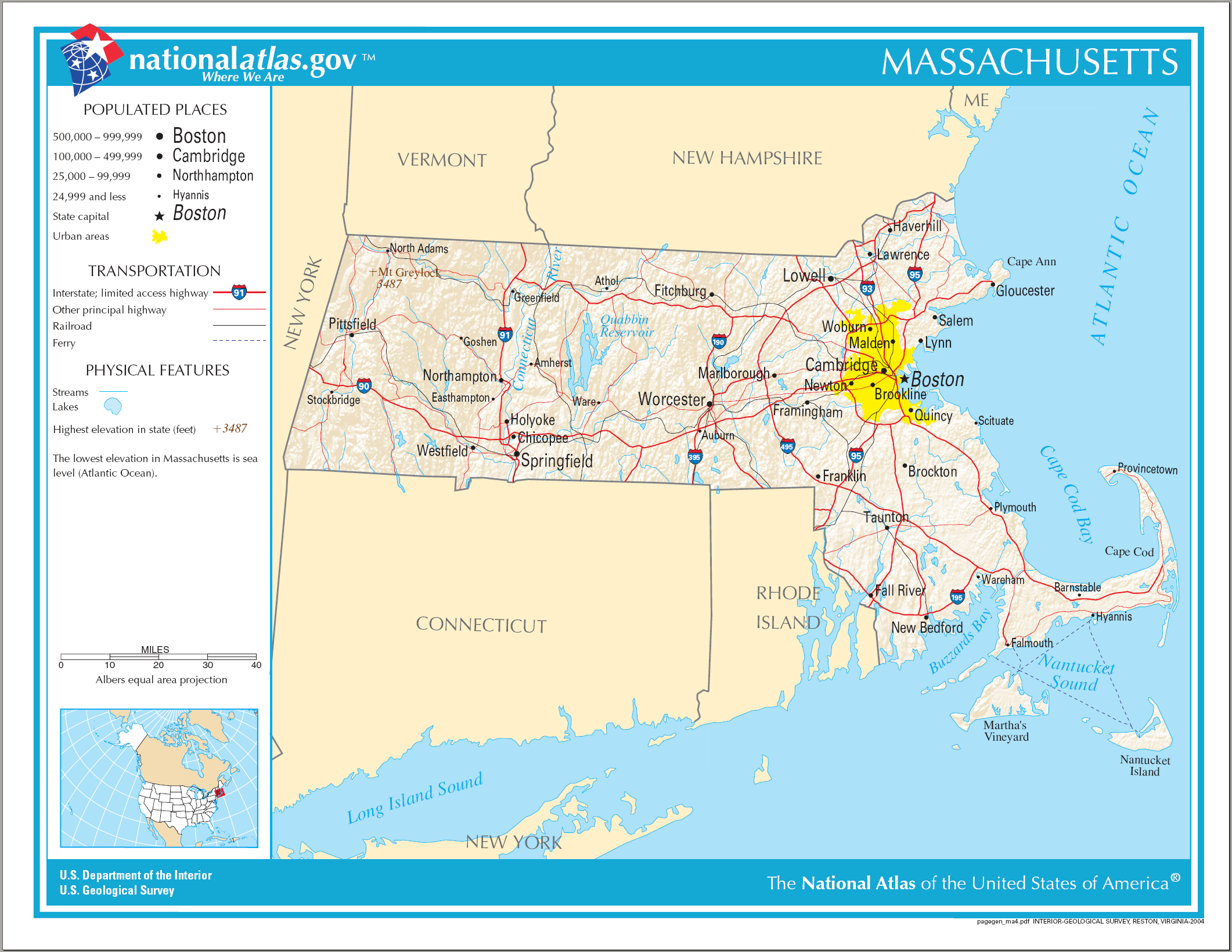
An enlargeable map of the Commonwealth of Massachusetts

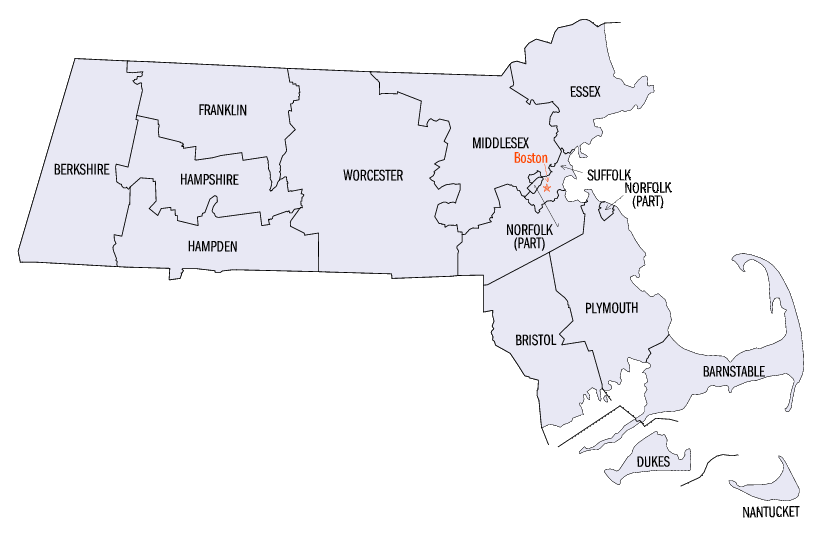
An enlargeable map of the 14 counties of the Commonwealth of Massachusetts

- Prehistory of Massachusetts
  - History of Massachusetts § Before European settlement (Indigenous peoples)
- English New-Plymouth Colony, November 23, 1620 – June 3, 1686
  - Mayflower Compact signed on November 21, 1620
- English New-England Colony, September 6, 1628 – March 4, 1629
- English Governour and Company of the Mattachusetts Bay in New-England, March 4, 1629 – June 3, 1686
  - Pequot War, July 20, 1636 – May 26, 1637
  - History of slavery in Massachusetts
  - King Philip's War, June 8, 1675 – August 12, 1676
- English Dominion of New-England in America, June 3, 1686 – May 18, 1689
- English Colony of New-Plymouth and Colony of Massachusetts Bay, May 18, 1689 – October 7, 1691
- English Province of Massachusetts Bay, October 7, 1691 – May 1, 1707
  - Queen Anne's War, 1702–1713
    - Raid on Deerfield, 1704
    - Treaty of Utrecht, 1713
- British Province of Massachusetts Bay, May 1, 1707 – May 30, 1776
  - Dummer's War, (1722–1725)
  - King George's War, 1740–1748
    - Treaty of Aix-la-Chapelle (1748)
  - French and Indian War, 1754–1763
    - Treaty of Paris of 1763
  - History of Massachusetts#Revolutionary Massachusetts: 1760s–1780s (Prelude to War)
    - Boston Massacre, March 5, 1770
    - Boston Tea Party, December 16, 1773
    - Parliament passes the Massachusetts Government Act, May 20, 1774
    - Massachusetts Provincial Congress organized, October 7, 1774
- American Revolutionary War, April 19, 1775 – September 3, 1783
  - Boston campaign, September 1, 1774 – March 17, 1776
    - Powder Alarm, September 1, 1774
    - Battles of Lexington and Concord, April 19, 1775
    - Siege of Boston, April 19, 1775 – March 17, 1776
      - Battle of Bunker Hill, June 17, 1775
  - United States Declaration of Independence, July 4, 1776
  - Treaty of Paris, September 3, 1783
- History of Massachusetts#Revolutionary Massachusetts: 1760s–1780s: "State of Massachusetts Bay", July 4, 1776 – October 25, 1780
    - Ninth state to ratify the Articles of Confederation and Perpetual Union, signed July 9, 1778
- History of Massachusetts#Federalist Era: 1780–1815: "Commonwealth of Massachusetts," since October 25, 1780
  - Western territorial claims ceded 1785
  - Shays Rebellion of 1786-1787
  - Sixth state to ratify the Constitution of the United States of America, February 6, 1788
  - Separation of the State of Maine, 1820
  - American Civil War, April 12, 1861 – May 13, 1865
    - Massachusetts in the American Civil War

=== History of Massachusetts, by region ===
- by city
  - History of Acton, Massachusetts
  - History of Dedham, Massachusetts (disambiguation)
  - History of Fall River, Massachusetts
  - History of Lowell, Massachusetts
  - History of Marshfield, Massachusetts
  - History of Oak Bluffs, Massachusetts
  - History of Springfield, Massachusetts
  - History of Uxbridge, Massachusetts
- by county
  - History of Berkshire County, Massachusetts
  - History of Bristol County, Massachusetts
  - History of Essex County, Massachusetts
  - History of Middlesex County, Massachusetts
  - History of Nantucket, Massachusetts
  - History of Norfolk County, Massachusetts
  - History of Suffolk County, Massachusetts
  - History of York County, Massachusetts

=== History of Massachusetts, by subject ===
- History of education in Massachusetts
  - History of the Massachusetts Institute of Technology
- List of Massachusetts state legislatures
- History of marriage in Massachusetts
- History of slavery in Massachusetts

== Culture of Massachusetts ==
Culture of Massachusetts

- Cuisine of Massachusetts
- Museums in Massachusetts
- Religion in Massachusetts
  - Episcopal Diocese of Massachusetts
  - Episcopal Diocese of Western Massachusetts
  - Roman Catholic Archdiocese of Boston
    - Roman Catholic Diocese of Burlington
    - Roman Catholic Diocese of Fall River
    - Roman Catholic Diocese of Manchester
    - Roman Catholic Diocese of Portland
    - Roman Catholic Diocese of Springfield in Massachusetts
    - Roman Catholic Diocese of Worcester
- Scouting in Massachusetts
- State symbols of Massachusetts
  - Flag of the Commonwealth of Massachusetts
  - Great Seal of the Commonwealth of Massachusetts

=== The arts in Massachusetts ===
- Music of Massachusetts
- Theater in Massachusetts

=== Sports in Massachusetts ===
Sports in Massachusetts

- Professional sports teams in Massachusetts

== Economy and infrastructure of Massachusetts ==
Economy of Massachusetts

- Communications in Massachusetts
  - Newspapers in Massachusetts
  - Radio stations in Massachusetts
  - Television stations in Massachusetts
- Energy in Massachusetts
- Health care in Massachusetts
  - Hospitals in Massachusetts
- Transportation in Massachusetts
  - Airports in Massachusetts
  - Rail transport in Massachusetts
  - Roads in Massachusetts
    - U.S. Highways in Massachusetts
    - Interstate Highways in Massachusetts
    - State highways in Massachusetts
- Water in Massachusetts

== Education in Massachusetts ==
Education in Massachusetts

- Schools in Massachusetts
  - School districts in Massachusetts
    - High schools in Massachusetts
  - Private schools in Massachusetts
  - Colleges and universities in Massachusetts
    - University of Massachusetts

== See also ==
- Topic overview:
  - Massachusetts
  - Index of Massachusetts-related articles
