= Lists of United States state symbols =

U.S. states, districts, and territories have representative symbols that are recognized by their state legislatures, territorial legislatures, or tradition. Some, such as flags, seals, and trees have been created or chosen by all U.S. polities, while others, such as state crustaceans, state mushrooms, and state toys have been chosen by only a few.

== Lists by symbol ==
=== Fauna, Funga and Microbial Life ===
- Amphibians
- Bats
- Birds
- Crustaceans
- Dinosaurs
- Dog breeds
- Fish
- Horse breeds
- Insects
- Mammals
- Microbes
- Mushrooms
- Reptiles
- Seashells

State	Amphibian	Bat	Bird	Cat	Crustacean	Dinosaur	Dog	Fish	Game animal	Horse	Insect	Mammal	Marine mammal	Microbe	Raptor	Reptile	Shell
Total	28	5	49	4	9	16	19	47	8	17	48	38	11	3	3	28	15
Alabama	check	X mark	check	X mark	check	X mark	X mark	check	check	check	check	check	check	X mark	X mark	check	check
Alaska	X mark	X mark	check	X mark	X mark	X mark	check	check	X mark	X mark	check	check	check	X mark	X mark	X mark	X mark
Arizona	check	X mark	check	X mark	X mark	check	X mark	check	X mark	X mark	check	check	X mark	X mark	X mark	check	X mark
Arkansas	X mark	X mark	check	X mark	X mark	check	check	check	X mark	X mark	check	check	X mark	X mark	X mark	X mark	X mark
California	check	check	check	X mark	check	check	X mark	check	X mark	X mark	check	check	check	X mark	X mark	check	X mark
Colorado	check	X mark	check	X mark	X mark	check	X mark	check	X mark	X mark	check	check	X mark	X mark	X mark	check	X mark
Connecticut	X mark	X mark	check	X mark	X mark	check	check	check	X mark	X mark	check	check	check	X mark	X mark	X mark	check
Delaware	X mark	X mark	check	X mark	X mark	check	check	check	X mark	X mark	check	check	X mark	X mark	X mark	X mark	check
Florida	X mark	X mark	check	X mark	X mark	X mark	X mark	check	X mark	check	check	check	check	X mark	X mark	check	check
Georgia	check	X mark	check	X mark	check	X mark	check	check	check	X mark	check	check	check	X mark	X mark	check	check
Hawaii	X mark	check	check	X mark	X mark	X mark	X mark	check	X mark	X mark	check	check	check	X mark	X mark	X mark	X mark
Idaho	check	X mark	check	X mark	X mark	check	X mark	check	X mark	check	check	X mark	X mark	X mark	check	X mark	X mark
Illinois	check	X mark	check	X mark	X mark	X mark	X mark	check	X mark	X mark	check	check	X mark	check	X mark	check	X mark
Indiana	X mark	X mark	check	X mark	X mark	X mark	X mark	X mark	X mark	X mark	check	X mark	X mark	X mark	X mark	X mark	X mark
Iowa	check	X mark	check	X mark	X mark	X mark	X mark	X mark	X mark	X mark	X mark	X mark	X mark	X mark	X mark	X mark	X mark
Kansas	check	X mark	check	X mark	X mark	X mark	X mark	check	X mark	X mark	check	check	X mark	X mark	X mark	check	X mark
Kentucky	X mark	X mark	check	X mark	X mark	X mark	X mark	check	check	check	check	X mark	X mark	X mark	X mark	X mark	X mark
Louisiana	check	X mark	check	X mark	check	X mark	check	check	X mark	X mark	check	check	X mark	X mark	X mark	check	X mark
Maine	check	X mark	check	check	check	X mark	check	check	X mark	X mark	check	check	X mark	X mark	X mark	check	X mark
Maryland	X mark	X mark	check	check	check	check	check	check	X mark	check	check	X mark	X mark	X mark	X mark	check	X mark
Massachusetts	X mark	X mark	check	check	X mark	check	check	check	check	check	check	X mark	check	X mark	X mark	check	check
Michigan	X mark	X mark	check	X mark	X mark	X mark	X mark	check	check	X mark	X mark	check	X mark	X mark	X mark	check	X mark
Minnesota	check	X mark	check	X mark	X mark	X mark	X mark	check	X mark	X mark	check	X mark	X mark	X mark	X mark	check	X mark
Mississippi	X mark	X mark	check	X mark	X mark	X mark	X mark	check	X mark	check	check	check	X mark	X mark	X mark	check	check
Missouri	check	X mark	check	X mark	X mark	check	X mark	check	check	check	check	check	X mark	X mark	X mark	check	X mark
Montana	X mark	X mark	check	X mark	X mark	X mark	X mark	check	X mark	X mark	check	check	X mark	X mark	X mark	X mark	X mark
Nebraska	X mark	X mark	check	X mark	X mark	X mark	X mark	check	X mark	X mark	check	check	X mark	X mark	X mark	X mark	X mark
Nevada	X mark	X mark	check	X mark	X mark	X mark	X mark	check	X mark	X mark	check	check	X mark	X mark	X mark	check	X mark
New Hampshire	check	X mark	check	check	X mark	X mark	check	check	X mark	X mark	check	check	X mark	X mark	check	X mark	X mark
New Jersey	check	X mark	check	X mark	X mark	check	check	check	X mark	check	check	X mark	X mark	check	X mark	check	check
New Mexico	check	X mark	check	X mark	X mark	X mark	X mark	check	X mark	X mark	check	check	X mark	X mark	X mark	check	X mark
New York	check	X mark	check	X mark	X mark	X mark	check	check	X mark	X mark	check	check	X mark	X mark	X mark	check	check
North Carolina	check	X mark	check	X mark	X mark	X mark	check	check	X mark	check	check	check	X mark	X mark	X mark	check	check
North Dakota	check	X mark	check	X mark	X mark	X mark	X mark	check	X mark	check	check	X mark	X mark	X mark	X mark	X mark	X mark
Ohio	X mark	X mark	check	X mark	X mark	X mark	X mark	X mark	X mark	X mark	check	check	X mark	X mark	X mark	X mark	X mark
Oklahoma	check	check	check	X mark	X mark	check	X mark	check	check	check	check	check	X mark	X mark	X mark	check	X mark
Oregon	X mark	X mark	check	X mark	check	X mark	X mark	check	X mark	X mark	check	check	X mark	check	check	check	check
Pennsylvania	check	X mark	X mark	X mark	X mark	X mark	check	check	check	X mark	X mark	check	X mark	X mark	X mark	X mark	X mark
Rhode Island	X mark	X mark	check	X mark	X mark	X mark	X mark	check	X mark	X mark	check	X mark	check	X mark	X mark	X mark	check
South Carolina	check	X mark	check	X mark	X mark	X mark	check	check	check	check	check	check	check	X mark	X mark	check	check
South Dakota	X mark	X mark	check	X mark	X mark	X mark	X mark	check	X mark	X mark	check	check	X mark	X mark	X mark	X mark	X mark
Tennessee	check	X mark	check	X mark	X mark	X mark	check	check	check	check	check	check	X mark	X mark	X mark	check	X mark
Texas	check	check	check	X mark	check	check	check	check	X mark	check	check	check	X mark	X mark	X mark	check	check
Utah	X mark	X mark	check	X mark	check	check	X mark	check	X mark	X mark	check	check	X mark	X mark	X mark	check	X mark
Vermont	check	X mark	check	X mark	X mark	X mark	X mark	check	X mark	check	check	X mark	X mark	X mark	X mark	check	X mark
Virginia	check	check	check	X mark	X mark	X mark	check	check	X mark	check	check	X mark	X mark	X mark	X mark	check	check
Washington	check	X mark	check	X mark	X mark	check	X mark	check	X mark	X mark	check	check	check	X mark	X mark	X mark	X mark
West Virginia	check	X mark	check	X mark	X mark	X mark	X mark	check	X mark	X mark	check	check	X mark	X mark	X mark	check	X mark
Wisconsin	X mark	X mark	check	X mark	X mark	X mark	check	check	X mark	X mark	check	check	X mark	X mark	X mark	X mark	X mark
Wyoming	check	X mark	check	X mark	X mark	check	X mark	check	X mark	X mark	check	check	X mark	X mark	X mark	check	X mark

=== Flora ===
- Flowers
- Grasses
- Plants
- Trees

State	Botanical garden or arboretum	Flower	Grass	Plant	Tree
Total	8	50	19	12	50
Alabama	X mark	check	X mark	X mark	check
Alaska	X mark	check	X mark	X mark	check
Arizona	X mark	check	X mark	X mark	check
Arkansas	X mark	check	X mark	X mark	check
California	X mark	check	check	check	check
Colorado	X mark	check	check	check	check
Connecticut	X mark	check	X mark	X mark	check
Delaware	X mark	check	X mark	check	check
Florida	X mark	check	X mark	X mark	check
Georgia	check	check	X mark	check	check
Hawaii	X mark	check	X mark	check	check
Idaho	X mark	check	X mark	X mark	check
Illinois	X mark	check	check	X mark	check
Indiana	X mark	check	X mark	X mark	check
Iowa	X mark	check	X mark	X mark	check
Kansas	X mark	check	check	X mark	check
Kentucky	check	check	X mark	X mark	check
Louisiana	X mark	check	X mark	check	check
Maine	X mark	check	X mark	check	check
Maryland	X mark	check	X mark	X mark	check
Massachusetts	X mark	check	X mark	X mark	check
Michigan	X mark	check	X mark	X mark	check
Minnesota	X mark	check	check	X mark	check
Mississippi	X mark	check	X mark	X mark	check
Missouri	X mark	check	check	X mark	check
Montana	check	check	check	X mark	check
Nebraska	X mark	check	check	X mark	check
Nevada	X mark	check	check	X mark	check
New Hampshire	X mark	check	X mark	X mark	check
New Jersey	X mark	check	X mark	X mark	check
New Mexico	X mark	check	check	X mark	check
New York	X mark	check	X mark	check	check
North Carolina	check	check	X mark	check	check
North Dakota	X mark	check	check	X mark	check
Ohio	X mark	check	X mark	X mark	check
Oklahoma	X mark	check	check	X mark	check
Oregon	X mark	check	X mark	X mark	check
Pennsylvania	check	check	X mark	check	check
Rhode Island	X mark	check	X mark	X mark	check
South Carolina	check	check	check	X mark	check
South Dakota	X mark	check	check	X mark	check
Tennessee	check	check	X mark	X mark	check
Texas	X mark	check	check	check	check
Utah	X mark	check	check	X mark	check
Vermont	X mark	check	X mark	X mark	check
Virginia	X mark	check	X mark	X mark	check
Washington	check	check	check	X mark	check
West Virginia	X mark	check	X mark	X mark	check
Wisconsin	X mark	check	check	X mark	check
Wyoming	X mark	check	check	check	check

=== Foods ===
- Beverages
- Foods
- Mushrooms

State	Bean	Beverage	Bread	Cookie	Dessert	Dish	Food	Fruit	Grain	Muffin	Mushroom	Nut	Snack	Steak	Vegetable
Total	3	32	2	3	13	8	41	33	5	3	8	6	6	2	15
Alabama	X mark	check	X mark	check	check	X mark	check	check	X mark	X mark	X mark	check	X mark	X mark	check
Alaska	X mark	X mark	X mark	X mark	X mark	X mark	X mark	X mark	X mark	X mark	X mark	X mark	X mark	X mark	X mark
Arizona	X mark	check	X mark	X mark	X mark	X mark	check	X mark	X mark	X mark	X mark	X mark	X mark	X mark	X mark
Arkansas	X mark	check	X mark	X mark	X mark	X mark	check	check	check	X mark	X mark	check	X mark	X mark	X mark
California	X mark	X mark	X mark	X mark	X mark	X mark	check	X mark	X mark	X mark	check	check	X mark	X mark	X mark
Colorado	X mark	X mark	X mark	X mark	X mark	X mark	X mark	X mark	X mark	X mark	check	X mark	X mark	X mark	X mark
Connecticut	X mark	X mark	X mark	X mark	X mark	check	check	X mark	X mark	X mark	X mark	X mark	X mark	X mark	X mark
Delaware	X mark	check	X mark	X mark	check	X mark	check	check	X mark	X mark	X mark	X mark	X mark	X mark	X mark
Florida	X mark	check	X mark	X mark	check	X mark	check	check	X mark	X mark	X mark	X mark	X mark	X mark	X mark
Georgia	X mark	X mark	X mark	X mark	X mark	check	check	check	X mark	X mark	X mark	X mark	X mark	X mark	check
Hawaii	X mark	check	X mark	X mark	X mark	X mark	X mark	X mark	X mark	X mark	X mark	X mark	X mark	X mark	X mark
Idaho	X mark	X mark	X mark	X mark	X mark	X mark	check	check	X mark	X mark	X mark	X mark	X mark	X mark	check
Illinois	check	X mark	X mark	X mark	check	X mark	check	check	check	X mark	check	X mark	check	X mark	check
Indiana	X mark	check	X mark	X mark	X mark	X mark	check	X mark	X mark	X mark	X mark	X mark	check	X mark	X mark
Iowa	X mark	X mark	X mark	X mark	X mark	X mark	X mark	X mark	X mark	X mark	X mark	X mark	X mark	X mark	X mark
Kansas	X mark	X mark	X mark	X mark	X mark	X mark	check	check	X mark	X mark	X mark	X mark	X mark	X mark	X mark
Kentucky	X mark	check	X mark	X mark	X mark	X mark	check	check	X mark	X mark	X mark	X mark	X mark	X mark	X mark
Louisiana	X mark	check	X mark	X mark	check	check	check	check	X mark	X mark	X mark	X mark	X mark	X mark	check
Maine	X mark	check	X mark	X mark	check	X mark	check	check	X mark	X mark	X mark	X mark	X mark	X mark	X mark
Maryland	X mark	check	X mark	X mark	check	X mark	check	X mark	X mark	X mark	X mark	X mark	X mark	X mark	X mark
Massachusetts	check	check	X mark	check	check	X mark	check	check	X mark	check	X mark	X mark	X mark	X mark	X mark
Michigan	X mark	X mark	X mark	X mark	X mark	X mark	check	X mark	check	X mark	X mark	X mark	X mark	X mark	X mark
Minnesota	X mark	check	X mark	X mark	X mark	X mark	check	check	check	check	check	X mark	X mark	X mark	X mark
Mississippi	X mark	check	X mark	X mark	X mark	X mark	check	check	X mark	X mark	X mark	X mark	X mark	X mark	X mark
Missouri	X mark	X mark	X mark	X mark	check	X mark	check	check	X mark	X mark	X mark	check	X mark	X mark	X mark
Montana	X mark	X mark	X mark	X mark	X mark	X mark	check	check	X mark	X mark	X mark	X mark	X mark	X mark	X mark
Nebraska	X mark	check	X mark	X mark	X mark	X mark	X mark	X mark	X mark	X mark	X mark	X mark	X mark	X mark	X mark
Nevada	X mark	check	X mark	X mark	X mark	X mark	X mark	X mark	X mark	X mark	X mark	X mark	X mark	X mark	X mark
New Hampshire	X mark	check	X mark	X mark	X mark	X mark	check	check	X mark	X mark	X mark	X mark	X mark	X mark	check
New Jersey	X mark	check	X mark	X mark	X mark	check	check	check	X mark	X mark	X mark	X mark	X mark	X mark	X mark
New Mexico	check	check	X mark	check	X mark	X mark	check	X mark	X mark	X mark	X mark	X mark	X mark	X mark	check
New York	X mark	check	X mark	X mark	X mark	X mark	check	check	X mark	check	X mark	X mark	check	X mark	X mark
North Carolina	X mark	check	X mark	X mark	X mark	X mark	check	check	X mark	X mark	X mark	X mark	X mark	X mark	check
North Dakota	X mark	check	X mark	X mark	X mark	X mark	check	check	X mark	X mark	X mark	X mark	X mark	X mark	X mark
Ohio	X mark	check	X mark	X mark	X mark	X mark	check	check	X mark	X mark	X mark	X mark	X mark	X mark	X mark
Oklahoma	X mark	X mark	X mark	X mark	X mark	check	check	check	X mark	X mark	X mark	X mark	X mark	check	check
Oregon	X mark	check	X mark	X mark	X mark	X mark	check	check	X mark	X mark	check	check	X mark	check	check
Pennsylvania	X mark	check	X mark	X mark	X mark	X mark	X mark	X mark	X mark	X mark	X mark	X mark	X mark	X mark	X mark
Rhode Island	X mark	check	X mark	X mark	X mark	check	check	check	X mark	X mark	X mark	X mark	X mark	X mark	X mark
South Carolina	X mark	check	X mark	X mark	X mark	check	check	check	X mark	X mark	X mark	X mark	check	X mark	check
South Dakota	X mark	check	check	X mark	check	X mark	check	X mark	X mark	X mark	X mark	X mark	X mark	X mark	X mark
Tennessee	X mark	check	X mark	X mark	X mark	X mark	check	check	X mark	X mark	X mark	X mark	X mark	X mark	X mark
Texas	X mark	X mark	check	X mark	check	check	check	check	X mark	X mark	check	check	check	X mark	check
Utah	X mark	X mark	X mark	X mark	X mark	X mark	check	check	X mark	X mark	check	X mark	check	X mark	check
Vermont	X mark	check	X mark	X mark	X mark	X mark	check	check	X mark	X mark	check	X mark	X mark	X mark	check
Virginia	X mark	check	X mark	X mark	check	X mark	X mark	X mark	X mark	X mark	X mark	X mark	X mark	X mark	X mark
Washington	X mark	check	X mark	X mark	X mark	X mark	check	check	X mark	X mark	X mark	X mark	X mark	X mark	check
West Virginia	X mark	X mark	X mark	X mark	X mark	X mark	check	check	X mark	X mark	X mark	X mark	X mark	X mark	X mark
Wisconsin	X mark	check	X mark	X mark	check	X mark	check	check	check	X mark	X mark	X mark	X mark	X mark	X mark
Wyoming	X mark	X mark	X mark	X mark	X mark	X mark	X mark	X mark	X mark	X mark	X mark	X mark	X mark	X mark	X mark

=== Geology ===
- Fossils
- Minerals, rocks, stones, and gemstones
- Soils

State	Fossil	Gemstone	Mineral	Rock or stone	Soil
Total	44	36	39	31	48
Alabama	check	check	check	check	check
Alaska	check	check	check	X mark	check
Arizona	check	check	check	X mark	check
Arkansas	X mark	check	check	check	check
California	check	check	check	check	check
Colorado	check	check	check	check	check
Connecticut	check	X mark	check	X mark	X mark
Delaware	check	X mark	check	X mark	check
Florida	X mark	check	X mark	check	check
Georgia	check	check	check	X mark	check
Hawaii	X mark	X mark	X mark	check	check
Idaho	check	check	X mark	X mark	check
Illinois	check	X mark	check	check	check
Indiana	check	X mark	X mark	check	check
Iowa	X mark	X mark	X mark	check	check
Kansas	check	check	check	check	check
Kentucky	check	check	check	check	check
Louisiana	check	check	check	X mark	check
Maine	check	check	X mark	check	check
Maryland	check	check	check	X mark	check
Massachusetts	check	check	check	check	check
Michigan	check	check	X mark	check	check
Minnesota	check	check	X mark	X mark	check
Mississippi	check	check	X mark	check	check
Missouri	check	X mark	check	check	check
Montana	check	check	X mark	X mark	check
Nebraska	check	check	X mark	check	check
Nevada	check	check	check	check	check
New Hampshire	X mark	check	check	check	check
New Jersey	check	X mark	check	X mark	check
New Mexico	check	check	X mark	X mark	check
New York	check	check	X mark	X mark	check
North Carolina	check	check	check	X mark	check
North Dakota	check	X mark	X mark	check	check
Ohio	check	check	X mark	X mark	check
Oklahoma	check	X mark	check	check	check
Oregon	check	check	check	check	check
Pennsylvania	check	X mark	X mark	X mark	check
Rhode Island	check	X mark	check	check	check
South Carolina	check	check	X mark	check	check
South Dakota	check	check	check	X mark	check
Tennessee	check	check	check	check	check
Texas	X mark	check	check	check	check
Utah	check	check	check	check	check
Vermont	check	check	check	check	check
Virginia	check	X mark	X mark	check	check
Washington	check	check	X mark	X mark	X mark
West Virginia	check	check	X mark	check	check
Wisconsin	check	X mark	check	check	check
Wyoming	check	check	X mark	X mark	check

=== Insignia ===
- Insignia
- Coats of arms
- Colors
- Flags
  - Governor standards
- Mottos
- Nicknames

State	Coat of arms	Colors	Flag	Governor flag	Governor seal	Motto	Nickname	Seal
Total	14	12	50	14	20	50	50	50
Alabama	check	X mark	check	check	check	check	check	check
Alaska	X mark	X mark	check	X mark	X mark	check	check	check
Arizona	X mark	check	check	X mark	X mark	check	check	check
Arkansas	X mark	X mark	check	X mark	X mark	check	check	check
California	X mark	check	check	check	check	check	check	check
Colorado	X mark	X mark	check	X mark	X mark	check	check	check
Connecticut	check	X mark	check	X mark	check	check	check	check
Delaware	check	X mark	check	X mark	check	check	check	check
Florida	X mark	X mark	check	X mark	X mark	check	check	check
Georgia	X mark	X mark	check	X mark	X mark	check	check	check
Hawaii	check	X mark	check	check	X mark	check	check	check
Idaho	X mark	X mark	check	X mark	X mark	check	check	check
Illinois	X mark	X mark	check	X mark	X mark	check	check	check
Indiana	X mark	check	check	X mark	X mark	check	check	check
Iowa	X mark	X mark	check	X mark	X mark	check	check	check
Kansas	X mark	X mark	check	check	X mark	check	check	check
Kentucky	X mark	X mark	check	X mark	X mark	check	check	check
Louisiana	check	check	check	X mark	X mark	check	check	check
Maine	X mark	X mark	check	X mark	check	check	check	check
Maryland	check	X mark	check	X mark	X mark	check	check	check
Massachusetts	check	check	check	check	check	check	check	check
Michigan	X mark	X mark	check	check	check	check	check	check
Minnesota	X mark	X mark	check	X mark	X mark	check	check	check
Mississippi	check	X mark	check	X mark	X mark	check	check	check
Missouri	check	X mark	check	X mark	X mark	check	check	check
Montana	X mark	X mark	check	X mark	X mark	check	check	check
Nebraska	X mark	X mark	check	X mark	X mark	check	check	check
Nevada	X mark	check	check	X mark	X mark	check	check	check
New Hampshire	X mark	X mark	check	X mark	X mark	check	check	check
New Jersey	check	check	check	X mark	X mark	check	check	check
New Mexico	X mark	X mark	check	X mark	check	check	check	check
New York	X mark	X mark	check	check	check	check	check	check
North Carolina	X mark	check	check	X mark	check	check	check	check
North Dakota	check	X mark	check	check	check	check	check	check
Ohio	X mark	X mark	check	check	check	check	check	check
Oklahoma	X mark	check	check	check	X mark	check	check	check
Oregon	X mark	check	check	X mark	X mark	check	check	check
Pennsylvania	check	X mark	check	check	check	check	check	check
Rhode Island	check	X mark	check	check	X mark	check	check	check
South Carolina	X mark	check	check	X mark	check	check	check	check
South Dakota	X mark	X mark	check	X mark	X mark	check	check	check
Tennessee	X mark	X mark	check	check	X mark	check	check	check
Texas	check	X mark	check	check	check	check	check	check
Utah	X mark	X mark	check	X mark	check	check	check	check
Vermont	X mark	X mark	check	X mark	X mark	check	check	check
Virginia	X mark	X mark	check	X mark	X mark	check	check	check
Washington	X mark	X mark	check	X mark	check	check	check	check
West Virginia	X mark	check	check	X mark	check	check	check	check
Wisconsin	X mark	X mark	check	X mark	check	check	check	check
Wyoming	X mark	X mark	check	X mark	check	check	check	check

=== Other ===
- Dances
- Firearms
- Musical instruments
- Poems
- Ships
- Songs
- Sports
- Tartans
- Theaters
- Toys

State	Dance	Firearm	Musical instrument	Poem	Ship	Song	Sport	Tartan	Theater	Toy
Total	28	10	9	10	16	48	18	28	10	1
Alabama	check	X mark	X mark	X mark	X mark	check	X mark	X mark	check	X mark
Alaska	X mark	check	X mark	X mark	X mark	check	check	X mark	X mark	X mark
Arizona	X mark	check	X mark	X mark	check	check	X mark	X mark	X mark	X mark
Arkansas	check	X mark	check	X mark	X mark	check	X mark	X mark	X mark	X mark
California	check	X mark	X mark	X mark	check	check	check	check	check	X mark
Colorado	check	X mark	X mark	X mark	X mark	check	check	check	X mark	X mark
Connecticut	check	X mark	X mark	X mark	check	check	X mark	check	X mark	X mark
Delaware	X mark	X mark	X mark	X mark	check	check	check	X mark	X mark	X mark
Florida	X mark	X mark	X mark	check	X mark	check	X mark	check	X mark	X mark
Georgia	check	X mark	X mark	X mark	X mark	check	X mark	check	check	X mark
Hawaii	check	X mark	check	X mark	X mark	check	check	check	X mark	check
Idaho	check	X mark	X mark	X mark	X mark	check	X mark	X mark	X mark	X mark
Illinois	check	X mark	X mark	X mark	X mark	check	X mark	check	X mark	X mark
Indiana	X mark	check	X mark	check	X mark	check	X mark	check	X mark	X mark
Iowa	X mark	X mark	X mark	X mark	X mark	check	X mark	check	X mark	X mark
Kansas	X mark	X mark	X mark	X mark	X mark	check	X mark	X mark	X mark	X mark
Kentucky	check	check	check	check	X mark	check	X mark	X mark	X mark	X mark
Louisiana	check	X mark	check	check	X mark	check	X mark	check	X mark	X mark
Maine	X mark	X mark	X mark	X mark	check	check	X mark	X mark	X mark	X mark
Maryland	check	X mark	X mark	X mark	check	X mark	check	X mark	check	X mark
Massachusetts	check	X mark	X mark	check	check	check	check	check		X mark
Michigan	X mark	X mark	X mark	X mark	X mark	check	check	check	X mark	X mark
Minnesota	X mark	X mark	X mark	X mark	X mark	check	check	X mark	X mark	X mark
Mississippi	check	X mark	X mark	X mark	X mark	check	X mark	X mark	X mark	check
Missouri	check	check	check	X mark	X mark	check	check	check	X mark	X mark
Montana	X mark	X mark	X mark	X mark	X mark	check	X mark	X mark	X mark	X mark
Nebraska	check	X mark	X mark	X mark	X mark	check	X mark	X mark	X mark	X mark
Nevada	X mark	X mark	X mark	X mark	X mark	check	X mark	check	X mark	X mark
New Hampshire	X mark	X mark	X mark	X mark	X mark	check	check	check	X mark	X mark
New Jersey	check	X mark	X mark	X mark	check	X mark	X mark	check	check	X mark
New Mexico	X mark	X mark	check	check	X mark	check	X mark	X mark	X mark	X mark
New York	X mark	X mark	X mark	X mark	X mark	check	check	X mark	X mark	X mark
North Carolina	check	X mark	X mark	check	check	check	check	check	check	X mark
North Dakota	X mark	X mark	X mark	X mark	X mark	check	check	X mark	X mark	X mark
Ohio	X mark	X mark	X mark	X mark	check	check	X mark	X mark	X mark	X mark
Oklahoma	check	X mark	check	check	X mark	check	X mark	check	check	X mark
Oregon	check	X mark	X mark	X mark	X mark	check	X mark	check	X mark	X mark
Pennsylvania	check	check	X mark	X mark	check	check	X mark	X mark	check	X mark
Rhode Island	X mark	X mark	X mark	X mark	check	check	X mark	check	X mark	X mark
South Carolina	check	X mark	X mark	X mark	X mark	check	X mark	check	X mark	X mark
South Dakota	X mark	X mark	check	X mark	X mark	check	check	X mark	X mark	X mark
Tennessee	check	check	X mark	check	X mark	check	X mark	check	check	X mark
Texas	check	check	check	check	check	check	check	check	X mark	X mark
Utah	check	check	X mark	X mark	check	check	X mark	check	X mark	X mark
Vermont	X mark	X mark	X mark	X mark	X mark	check	X mark	X mark	X mark	X mark
Virginia	check	X mark	X mark	X mark	check	check	X mark	check	check	X mark
Washington	check	X mark	X mark	X mark	check	check	check	check	X mark	X mark
West Virginia	X mark	check	X mark	X mark	X mark	check	X mark	check	X mark	X mark
Wisconsin	check	X mark	X mark	X mark	X mark	check	X mark	check	X mark	X mark
Wyoming	X mark	X mark	X mark	X mark	X mark	check	check	X mark	X mark	X mark

== Lists by state, territory, and district ==
- Alabama
- Alaska
- American Samoa
- Arizona
- Arkansas
- California
- Colorado
- Connecticut
- Delaware
- District of Columbia
- Florida
- Georgia
- Guam
- Hawaii
- Idaho
- Illinois
- Indiana
- Iowa
- Kansas
- Kentucky
- Louisiana
- Maine
- Maryland
- Massachusetts
- Michigan
- Minnesota
- Mississippi
- Missouri
- Montana
- Nebraska
- Nevada
- New Hampshire
- New Jersey
- New Mexico
- New York
- North Carolina
- North Dakota
- Northern Mariana Islands
- Ohio
- Oklahoma
- Oregon
- Pennsylvania
- Puerto Rico
- Rhode Island
- South Carolina
- South Dakota
- Tennessee
- Texas
- U.S. Virgin Islands
- Utah
- Vermont
- Virginia
- Washington
- West Virginia
- Wisconsin
- Wyoming

== See also ==
- National symbol
  - National symbols of the United States
- List of Canadian provincial and territorial symbols
- Lists of Brazil state symbols
- List of symbols of states and territories of Australia
