= List of California state symbols =

Official flag, motto, animals and so on

Location of the state of California in the United States of America

Most of the officially designated emblems of the state of California are found in sections 420–429.8 of the California Codes. The oldest symbol is the Great Seal, designated in 1849. The most recently designated symbol is the Giant garter snake, designated in 2025.

== Insignia ==
Type	Symbol	Year	Image
Flag	The Bear Flag	1911	California flag
Seal	The Great Seal of the State of California	1849	California seal
Motto	"Eureka"	1963	
Nicknames	Golden State	1968	
Song	"I Love You, California"	1989	California seal

== Animals ==
Type	Symbol	Year	Image
Amphibian	California red-legged frog Rana draytonii	2014	Rana draytonii
Animal	California grizzly bear Ursus arctos californicus	1958	California grizzly bear
Bat	Pallid bat Antrozous pallidus	2024	California quail
Bird	California quail Callipepla californica	1931	California quail
Crustacean	Dungeness crab Metacarcinus magister	2024	Dungeness Crab
Dinosaur	Augustynolophus	2017	Augustynolophus
Freshwater fish	Golden trout Oncorhynchus mykiss aguabonita	1947	Golden Trout
Insect	California dogface butterfly Colias eurydice	1972	California Dogface Butterfly
Marine fish	Garibaldi; Hypsypops rubicundus	2002	Garibaldi
Marine mammal	Gray whale Eschrichtius robustus	1975	Grey Whale
Marine reptile	Leatherback sea turtle Dermochelys coriacea	2012	Leatherback Sea Turtle
Reptile	Desert tortoise Gopherus agassizi	2012	Desert Tortoise
Slug	Banana slug Genus Ariolimax	2024	Banana slug, Ariolimax buttoni
Snake	Giant garter snake Thamnophis gigas	2025	Banana slug, Ariolimax buttoni

== Plants ==
Type	Symbol	Year	Image
Flower	Golden poppy Eschscholzia californica	1903	California Poppy
Fruit	Avocado; Persea americana	2013 (Note: In a proclamation as acting governor, Lt. Gov. Gavin Newsom declared the avocado State fruit. It is not in the legislature.)	Avocado
Grass	Purple needlegrass Stipa pulchra (formerly Nassella pulchra)	2004	Purple Needlegrass
Lichen	Lace lichen Ramalina menziesii	2015	Lace lichen
Mushroom	California Golden Chanterelle Cantharellus californicus	2023	California Golden Chanterelle
Nuts	Almond, Walnut, Pistachio, and Pecan	2017	Almond
Shrub	Bigberry manzanita Arctostaphylos glauca	2025	Coast Redwood
Trees	California Redwood; Sequoia sempervirens & Sequoiadendron giganteum	1953	Coast Redwood
Vegetable	Artichoke; Cynara cardunculus var. scolymus	2013 (Note: In a proclamation as acting governor, Lt. Gov. Gavin Newsom declared the cauliflower State vegetable. It is not in the legislature.)	Artichoke

== Geology ==
Type	Symbol	Year	Image
Fossil	Saber-toothed cat Smilodon californicus	2017	Smilodon
Gemstone	Benitoite	1985	Benitoite
Mineral	Gold	1965	Gold
Rock	Serpentine	1965	Serpentine
Seashell	Black abalone Haliotis cracherodii	2024	Black abalone seashell
Soil	San Joaquin	1997	San Joaquin Soil

== Culture and history ==
Type	Symbol	Year	Image
Colors	Blue and gold	2017	blue and gold
Dance	West Coast Swing	1988	
Fabric	Denim	2016	Denim
Fife and drum band	California Consolidated Drum Band	1997	
Folk dance	Square dance	1988	Square Dance
Gold rush ghost town	Bodie	2002	Bodie California
Historical society	California Historical Society	1979	California Historical Society
LGBTQ Veterans Memorial	LGBTQ Veterans Memorial at Desert Memorial Park in Cathedral City	2018	
Military museum	California State Military Museum	2004	Military Museum minecraft
Outdoor play	The Ramona Pageant	1993	The Ramona Pageant
Prehistoric artifact	Chipped Stone Bear	1991	
Silver rush ghost town	Calico	2005	Calico California
Sport	Surfing	2018	Surfing
Tall ship	Californian	2003	Californian
Tartan	California state tartan	2001	California State Tartan
Theater	Pasadena Playhouse	1937	Pasadena Playhouse
Vietnam veterans memorial	California Vietnam Veterans Memorial	2014	

== See also ==
- List of California-related topics
- Lists of United States state insignia
