= List of Maryland state symbols =

Location of the state of Maryland in the United States of America

This is a list of symbols of the U.S. state of Maryland. Most of the items in the list are officially recognized symbols created by an act of the Maryland General Assembly and signed into law by the governor. However, two of the more famous symbols of Maryland, the state motto and the state nicknames, were never made official by the state government. While the state seal derives from the colonial heritage of the state, the majority of official state symbols were designated in the last few decades.

== Insignia ==
Type	Symbol	Description	Year	Image	Source
Flag	The Flag of Maryland	Banner of the Arms of the Calvert and Crossland families. While 1904 was the official date of adoption, the flag has colonial roots. Calvert was the surname of the Lords Baltimore, proprietors of the Maryland colony, and Crossland was the maiden name of the mother of George Calvert, 1st Baron Baltimore.	1904	Maryland flag	
Motto	Fatti maschii, parole femine Literally: manly deeds, womanly words Officially: strong deeds, gentle words	The state motto has never been formally adopted, though it was the motto of the Calvert family upon the founding of Maryland in 1634 and appears on the Great Seal of Maryland.	Traditional	—	
Nicknames	The Old Line State	The Old Line State might have originated as a nickname given by George Washington during the Revolutionary War to the Maryland line of troops.	Traditional	—	
Nicknames	The Free State	The Free State originated from an editorial in the Baltimore Sun in 1923 on how Maryland should be free by seceding from the Union rather than prohibiting alcohol.	Traditional	—	
Seal	The Great Seal of Maryland	The obverse side shows Lord Baltimore as a knight on a charging horse. The reverse side shows the Calvert seal, a plowman, a fisherman, the state motto and a Latin text that translates as "You have crowned us with the shield of your goodwill."	1969		
Coat of arms	The coat of arms of Maryland	The Calvert arms, a plowman, a fisherman, the state motto and a Latin text that translates as "You have crowned us with the shield of your goodwill."			

== Species ==
Type	Symbol	Description	Year	Image	Source
Bird	Baltimore oriole Icterus galbula	The male's black and orange feathers are similar to the Calvert seal. This led to the bird receiving its name of Baltimore.	1947	Baltimore oriole	
Cat	Calico cat	The calico has tri-color fur of orange, black, and white, which are the same colors as the Calvert seal.	2001	Calico cat	
Crustacean	Blue crab Callinectes sapidus	The blue crab is found in the Chesapeake Bay and is the most valuable species harvested from the bay.	1989	Blue crab	
Dinosaur	Astrodon; Astrodon johnstoni	In 1958, the first Astrodon fossils were found in Maryland. They lived in what is now Maryland from 130 to 95 million years ago.	1998	Astrodon	
Dog	Chesapeake Bay Retriever	Named after the Chesapeake Bay, the retriever was developed in the United States to recover waterfowl for hunters. The University of Maryland, Baltimore County's mascot is a retriever.	1964	Chesapeake Bay Retriever	
Fish	Rock fish Morone saxatilis	The rockfish, also called striped bass, is found in abundance in Maryland.	1965	Rockfish	
Flower	Black-eyed susan Rudbeckia hirta	A daisy with yellow petals and a dark purple center.	1918	Black-eyed susan	
Horse	Thoroughbred horse Equus caballus	The Preakness, the second leg of the Triple Crown of thoroughbred racing is held at Pimlico Race Course in Baltimore, Maryland.	2003	Thoroughbred horse	
Insect	Baltimore checkerspot butterfly (Euphydryas phaeton)	The butterfly has orange and black colorings, which are the same colors as the Calvert seal.	1973	Baltimore checkerspot butterfly	
Reptile	Diamondback terrapin Malaclemys terrapin	The terrapin were abundant and easy to catch and became a gourmet food until over-harvesting depleted terrapin stocks. The University of Maryland's nickname is the "terrapins".	1994	Diamondback terrapin	
Shark	Megalodon; Otodus megalodon	The megalodon is an extinct species of shark whose fossilized teeth can be found in the Chesapeake Bay around the shores of Calvert Cliffs State Park.	2026	Megalodon jaws on display at the National Aquarium, Baltimore	
Tree	White oak Quercus alba	A long-lived and one of the pre-eminent hardwoods of America. It is also the state tree of Illinois and Connecticut. The Wye Oak was believed to be the largest and oldest white oak, being 540 years old until it fell during a thunderstorm in 2002.	1941	White oak	

== Geology ==
Type	Symbol	Description	Year	Image	Source
Fossil	Ecphora gardnerae gardnerae	The shell of an extinct snail that is commonly found throughout Maryland.	1994	Ecphora gardnerae gardnerae	
Gem	Patuxent River stone an agate	A yellow and red, almost an orange hue, quartz found only in Maryland. It is named after the Patuxent River.	2004	Tumbled specimens of Patuxent River Stone	
Mineral	Chromite	A crystalline mineral first discovered in the Bare Hills area of Baltimore County in 1808 by Isaac Tyson Jr.	2025	Chromium from Baltimore	

== Culture ==
Type	Symbol	Description	Year	Image	Source
Boat	Skipjack	Skipjacks would dredge the Chesapeake Bay for oysters.	1985	Skipjack	
Cocktail	Orange Crush	The Orange Crush cocktail was invented at the Harborside Bar & Grill in West Ocean City, Maryland, in 1995.	2025	Orange Crush	
Dessert	Smith Island Cake	A cake with eight to fifteen layers and chocolate frosting between each layer. The recipe originated in Smith Island, Maryland.	2008		
Drink	Milk	Cow's Milk	1998	Milk	
Exercise	Walking	A healthy form of physical exercise.	2008	Two people walking	
Folk dance	Square dance	A folk dance with four couples arranged in a square. As of 2011, it is the official state dance for 21 states.	1994	Square dancers	
Spirit	Rye whiskey	Rye whiskey was first produced along the Chesapeake Bay in colonial times, and became popular during the American Civil War. Maryland was once the fifth largest liquor producer in the United States, but prohibition led to the industry's steady decline until the closure of Maryland's last distillery in 1972. Rye distilling would not return to the state until 2014.	2023	Rye whiskey	
Song (former)	From 1939 to 2021, "Maryland, My Maryland", which set lyrics from a poem written by James Ryder Randall to the tune of "O Tannenbaum", was the Maryland state song. It was repealed by an act of the Maryland general assembly in 2021.		1939–2021	Maryland, My Maryland	
Sport (individual)	Jousting	Jousting tournaments in the form of ring tournaments have been held in Maryland since colonial times. The Maryland State Jousting Championship has been held annually since 1950 and is sponsored by the Maryland Jousting Tournament Association	1962	Jousting	
Sport (team)	Lacrosse	Lacrosse is the oldest known sport to be played in America. Maryland is home to the National Lacrosse Hall of Fame and Museum.	2004	Lacrosse	
Summer theater	Olney Theatre Center	Olney Theatre was founded in 1938 and offers include the Summer Shakespeare Festival and summer training programs for High School students.	1978	Interior of Olney Theatre	
Theater	Center Stage	Center Stage was founded in 1963 and is Maryland's largest theater company.	1978	Center Stage theater	
