= List of Georgia state symbols =

Location of the state of Georgia in the United States

The state of Georgia has numerous symbols, as defined in the Official Code of Georgia Annotated or by joint resolutions of the Georgia General Assembly. The oldest symbol is the Great Seal of Georgia, designated by the Constitution of Georgia in 1798. The most recently designated symbol is the Southeast Georgia Soap Box Derby, added in 2024.

== Insignia ==
Overview of insignias of Georgia
Type	Symbol	Year	Image
Flag	Flag of Georgia	2003	Georgia State Flag
Motto	"Wisdom, Justice, Moderation"	1799	
Seal	Great Seal of Georgia	1798 (1914) (Note: The state seal was defined by the Georgia Constitution of 1798 and bore the date 1799. In 1914, the date was changed to 1776.)	
Creed	Georgian's Creed	1939	
Song	"Georgia on My Mind" lyrics by Stuart Gorrell and music by Hoagy Carmichael with words by Robert Loveman	1979	

== Plants ==
Overview of plant symbols of Georgia
Type	Symbol	Year	Image
Crop	Peanut	1995	Peanuts
Flower	Sweetbay Magnolia magnolia virginiana	2026	
Fruit	Peach	1995	Peach
Grape	Muscadine grape	2021	Muscadine Grape
Nut	Pecan	2021	
Tree	Southern live oak Quercus virginiana	1937	
Vegetable	Vidalia sweet onion	1990	Vidalia Onions
Wildflower	Azalea; Rhododendron sp.	1979	

== Animals ==
Overview of animal symbols of Georgia
Type	Symbol	Year	Image
Amphibian	American green tree frog Hyla cinerea	2005	American Gr-een Tree Frog
Bird	Brown thrasher Toxostoma rufum	1935 (1970)	Brown Thrasher
Butterfly	Eastern tiger swallowtail Papilio glaucus	1988	Eastern Tiger Swallowtail
Cold water game fish	Southern Appalachian brook trout Salvelinus fontinalis	2006	Southern Appalachian brook trout
Crustacean	White shrimp	2024	
Dog	"Adoptable dog"	2016	
Fish	Largemouth bass	1970	Largemouth Bass
Game bird	Bobwhite quail	1970	Bobwhite quail
Insect	Honeybee	1975	
Mammal	White-tailed deer Odocoileus virginianus	2015	
Marine mammal	North Atlantic right whale Eubalaena glacialis	1985	
Reptile	Gopher tortoise Gopherus polyphemus	1989	
Riverine sport fish	Shoal bass Micropterus cataractae	2020	
Salt-water fish	Red drum Sciaenops ocellatus	2006	Largemouth Bass

== Geology ==
Overview of geological symbols of Georgia
Type	Symbol	Year	Image
Fossil	Shark tooth	1976	Shark teeth
Gem	Quartz	1976	
Mineral	Staurolite	1976	Staurolite
Seashell	Knobbed whelk Busycon carica	1987	

== Culture ==
Overview of cultural symbols of Georgia
Type	Symbol	Year	Image
Art museum	Georgia Museum of Art	1982	
Atlas	The Atlas of Georgia	1985	
Ballet company	Atlanta Ballet	1973	Atlanta Ballet
Beef barbecue championship Cook-off	The Hawkinsville Civitan Club's "Shoot the Bull" barbecue championship	1997	
Botanical garden	State Botanical Garden of Georgia	1984	
Center for character education	National Museum of the Mighty Eighth Air Force	2005	
First Mural City	Colquitt	2006	
Folk dance	Square dance	1996	Square dancing
Folk festival	Georgia Folk Festival	1992	
Folk life play	Swamp Gravy	1994	
Frontier and southeastern Indian interpretive center	Funk Heritage Center	2003	
Historic drama	The Reach of Song, a play about mountain writer Byron Herbert Reece	1990	
Historical civil rights museum	Ralph Mark Gilbert Civil Rights Museum	2008	
Musical theater	Jekyll Island Musical Theatre Festival	1993	
Peanut monument	Turner County on the west side of Interstate Highway 75 within the limits of the city of Ashburn	1998	
Poet Laureate	Poet Laureate of Georgia	1925	
Pork cook-off	The Dooly County Chamber of Commerce's "Slosheye Trail Big Pig Jig"	1997	
'Possum	Pogo 'Possum	1992	
Prepared food	Grits	2002	Grits
Railroad museum	The Central of Georgia Railroad Shops Complex; Savannah	1996	
School	Plains High School, now part of the Jimmy Carter National Historic Site	1997	
Soap Box Derby	Southeast Georgia Soap Box Derby	2024	
Tartan	Georgia Tartan	1997	
Theater	Springer Opera House; Columbus	1971–2 (1992) (Note: As governor, Jimmy Carter made it the state theater for the 1971–1972 season. In 1992, the legislature made the designation formal and ongoing.)	
Transportation history museum	Southeastern Railway Museum	2000	
Waltz	"Our Georgia"	1951	
