= List of Mississippi state symbols =

The following is a list of state symbols of the U.S. state of Mississippi, as defined by state statutes in Title 1, Section 3 of the Mississippi Code of 1972 and listed in the Mississippi Official & Statistical Register.

== Insignia ==
Type	Symbol	Date	Image
Flag	Flag of Mississippi	2021	
Seal	Seal of Mississippi	2014	Seal of Mississippi
Coat of arms	Coat of arms of Mississippi	2001	Coat of arms of Mississippi
Motto	Virtute et armis (Latin for "By valor and arms")		
Nicknames	The Magnolia State, The Hospitality State		

== Flora ==
Type	Symbol	Date	Image
Flower	Magnolia	1900	
Tree	Southern magnolia (Magnolia grandiflora)	1952	
Fruit	Blueberry	2023	

== Fauna ==
Type	Symbol	Date	Image
Bird	Northern mockingbird (Mimus polyglottos)	1944	
Butterfly	Spicebush swallowtail (Papilio troilus)	1991	
Fish	Largemouth bass (Micropterus salmoides)	1974	
Fossil	Prehistoric whales (Basilosaurus cetoides and Zygorhiza kochii)	1981	
Insect	Western honey bee (Apis mellifera)	1980	
Land Mammals	White-tailed deer (Odocoileus virginianus)	1974	
Land Mammals	Red fox (Vulpes vulpes)	1997	
Marine mammal	Bottlenose dolphin (Tursiops truncatus)	1974	
Waterfowl	Wood duck (Aix sponsa)	1974	
Reptile	American alligator (Alligator mississippiensis)	1987	
Shell	Eastern oyster (Crassostrea virginica)	1974	

== Other ==
Type	Symbol	Date	Image
Dance	Square dance	1995	
Soil	Natchez silt loam	2003	
Song	One Mississippi by Steve Azar	2022	
Stone	Petrified wood	1976	
Toy	Teddy bear	2003	
Tartan	Tartan (pattern for Celtic wear such as Kilts)	2026	Mississippi Tartan
