= List of Texas state symbols =

Location of the state of Texas in the United States of America

The following is a list of symbols of the U.S. state of Texas.

== Insignia ==
Type	Symbol	Date designated	Image
Flag	The Lone Star Flag	June 30, 1839	
National seal	Seal of the Republic of Texas	January 25, 1839	
State seal	Seal of Texas	December 29, 1845	
Reverse of the seal		August 26, 1961	
National coat of arms	Coat of arms of the Republic of Texas	January 25, 1839	
State coat of arms	Coat of arms of Texas	1993	
National guard crest	Crest of the Texas National Guard	February 18, 1924	

== Animals ==
Type	Symbol	Date designated	Image
Bird	Northern mockingbird	1927	
Dog	Blue Lacy	June 18, 2005	
Dinosaur	Sauroposeidon proteles	2009 (replaced Pleurocoelus which was state dinosaur 1997–2009)	
Fish	Guadalupe bass (Micropterus treculii)	1989	
Horse	American Quarter Horse	2009	
Insect	Monarch butterfly (Danaus plexippus)	1995	
Mammal (small)	Armadillo	1995	
Mammal (large)	Texas Longhorn	1995	
Mammal (flying)	Mexican free-tailed bat (Tadarida brasiliensis)	1995	
Reptile	Texas horned lizard (Phrynosoma cornutum), commonly called the horny toad or horned frog.	1993	

== Plants ==
Type	Symbol	Date designated	Image
Flower	Bluebonnets (Lupinus spp., namely Texas bluebonnet, L. texensis and sandy land bluebonnet L. subcarnosus)	March 1901	
Tree	Pecan (Carya illinoinensis)	1919	
Fruit	Texas red grapefruit	1993	
Grass	Sideoats grama (Bouteloua curtipendula)	1971	
Nut	Pecan (carya illinoinensis)	1919	
Pepper (native)	Chiltepin (Capsicum annuum var. glabriusculum)		
Pepper (other)	Jalapeño	1995	
Plant	Prickly pear cactus (Opuntia sp.)	1995	
Shrub (native)	Texas sage (Leucophyllum frutescens)		
Shrub	Crape myrtle (Lagerstroemia indica)		
Vegetable	Texas sweet onion	1997	Sweet onions in a pile

== Geology ==
Type	Symbol	Date designated	Image
Soil	Houston Black		
Gem	Texas blue topaz	1969	Blue topaz emerald-cut faceted gemstone
Gemstone cut	Lone Star Cut		
Shell	Lightning whelk (Sinistrofulgur perversum pulleyi)	1987	
Stone	Petrified palmwood		

== Food ==
Type	Symbol	Date designated	Image
Bread	Pan de campo		Pan de campo
Cooking implement	Dutch oven		
Dish	Chili	1977	
Pastry	Strudel and sopaipilla	2003-2005	Strudel pastries Sopapilla pastries
Snack	Tortilla chips and salsa	1995	A bowl of tortilla chips with red salsa and green guacamole

== Other official designations ==
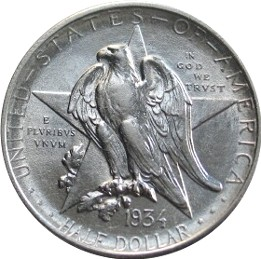
Texas Centennial half dollar commemorative

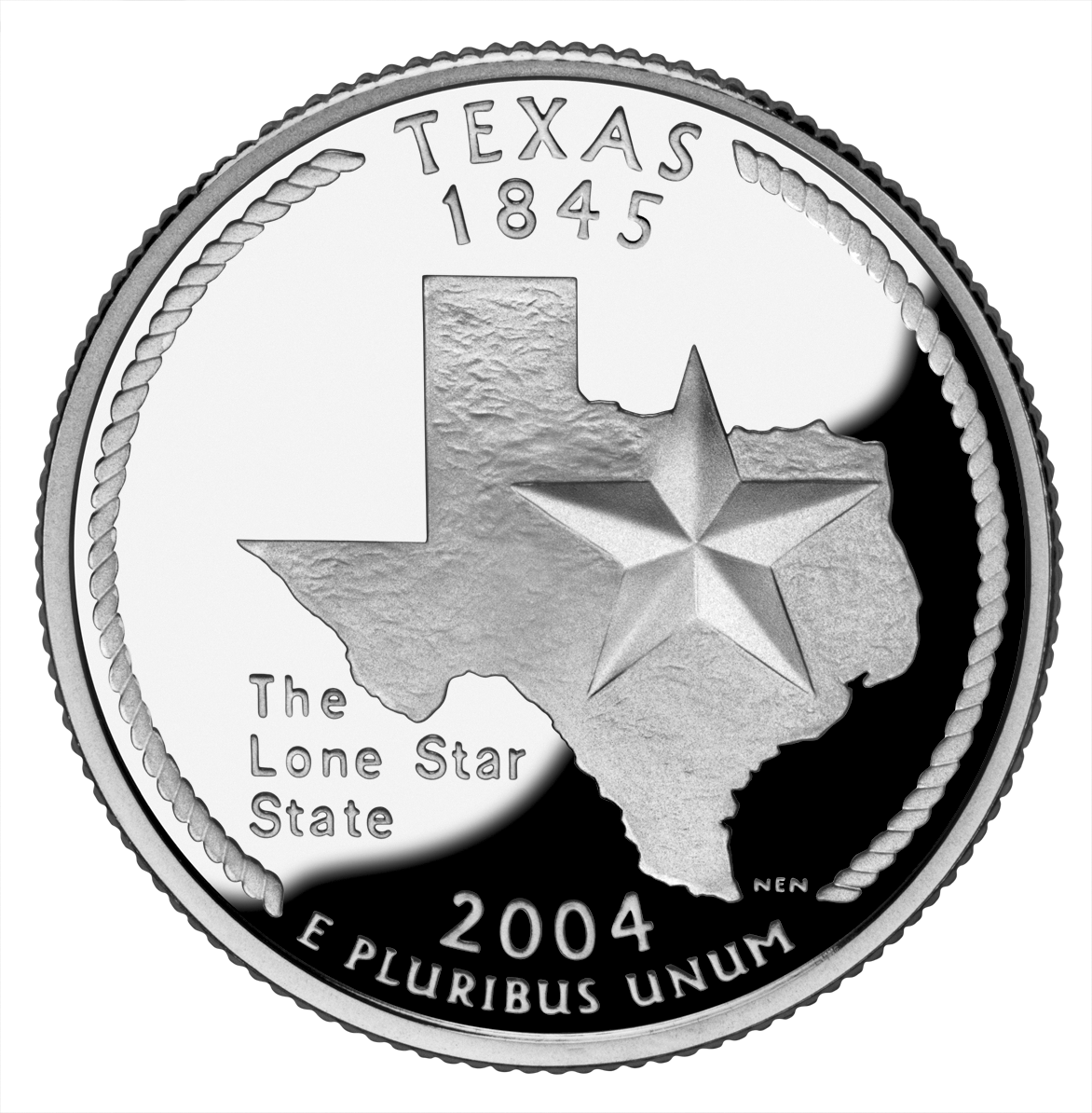
Texas quarter reverse

Type	Symbol	Date Designated	Image
Motto	"Friendship"	1930	
Nickname	"The Lone Star State"	2015	
Slogan	"The Friendly State"	1930	
Song	"Texas, Our Texas"	1929	
Air force	Commemorative Air Force		
Domino game	Texas 42, a four-player domino game with bidding and trumps		
Fiber and fabric	Cotton	1997	
Flower song	Bluebonnets	1933	
Folk dance	Square dance	1991	Square Dance Group
Gun	Cannon	2025	
Handgun	Colt Walker	2021	
Knife	Bowie Knife	2021	
Music	Western swing		
Musical instrument	Acoustic guitar		
Play	Fort Griffin Fandangle, The Lone Star, Texas, Beyond Sundown		
Ship	The battleship USS Texas (BB-35)		
Sport	Rodeo	1997	
Tartan	Texas Bluebonnet Tartan	May 25, 1989	
Tie	Bolo tie	2007	

== Pledge to the Texas flag ==
A pledge of allegiance to the Texas flag was established in 1933.

Honor the Texas flag; I pledge allegiance to thee, Texas, one and indivisible.

Updated on June 15, 2007 to:

Honor the Texas flag;
I pledge allegiance to thee, Texas,
one state under God,
one and indivisible.

== Ships ==
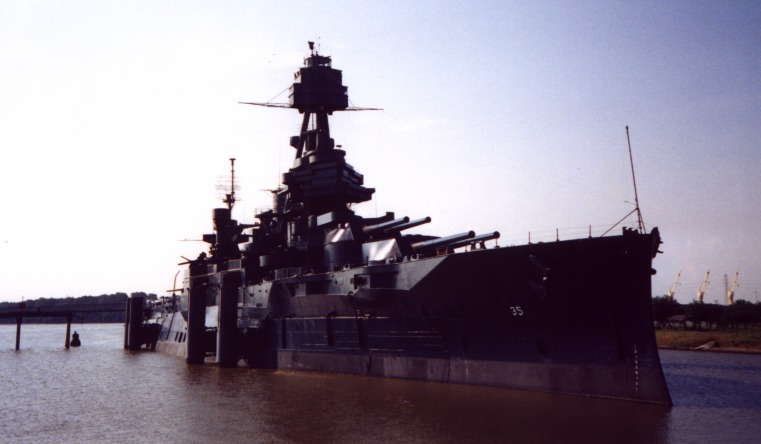
USS Texas (BB-35), the oldest remaining dreadnought.

Four ships of the United States Navy and one in the Confederate States Navy have borne the name Texas:

- CSS Texas
- USS Texas (1892)
- USS Texas (BB-35)
- USS Texas (DLGN/CGN-39)
- USS Texas (SSN-775)

== See also ==
- Outline of Texas
- List of U.S. state, district, and territorial insignia
