= List of Wisconsin state symbols =

Location of the state of Wisconsin in the United States of America

This is a list of the state symbols of the U.S. state of Wisconsin.

== Insignia ==
Type	Symbol	Year	Image
Flag	The flag of Wisconsin	1863	The flag of Wisconsin
Motto	"Forward"	1851	Statue of "Forward"
Nicknames	Badger State		
Seal	The Great Seal of Wisconsin	1881	The seal of Wisconsin

== Species ==
Type	Symbol	Year	Image
Animal	Badger; Taxidea taxus	1957	A badger, the state animal of Wisconsin
Bird	American robin Turdus migratorius	1949	A robin, the state bird of Wisconsin
Domestic animal	Dairy cow Bos taurus	1971	A dairy cow, the state domestic animal of Wisconsin
Dog	American Water Spaniel	1985	An American water spaniel, the state dog of Wisconsin
Fish	Muskellunge; Esox masquinongy	1955	
Flower	Wood violet Viola sororia	1909	
Fruit	Cranberry; Vaccinium macrocarpon	2003	Cranberries, the state fruit of Wisconsin
Grain	Corn; Zea mays	1989	Corn, the state grain of Wisconsin
Insect	Western honey bee Apis mellifera	1977	A honey bee, the state insect of Wisconsin
Tree	Sugar maple Acer saccharum	1949	A sugar maple, the state tree of Wisconsin
Wildlife animal	White-tailed deer Odocoileus virginianus	1957	A white-tailed deer, the state wildlife animal of Wisconsin

== Geology ==
Type	Symbol	Year	Image
Fossil	Trilobite; Calymene celebra	1985	Trilobite, the state fossil of Wisconsin
Mineral	Galena	1971	Galena, the state mineral of Wisconsin
Rock	Granite	1971	Red granite, the state rock of Wisconsin
Soil	Antigo (soil)	1983	Antigo Silt Loam, the state soil of Wisconsin

== Culture ==
Type	Symbol	Year	Image
Ballad	"Oh Wisconsin, Land of My Dreams"	2001	
Beverage	Milk	1987	Milk, the state beverage of Wisconsin
Dance	Polka	1993	
Pastry	Kringle	2013	Kringle from Racine, Wisconsin
Slogan	America's Dairyland	1940	
Song	"On, Wisconsin!"	1959	
Symbol of peace	Mourning dove Zenaidura macroura carolinensis	1971	A mourning dove, Wisconsin's symbol of peace
Tartan	Wisconsin tartan	2007	
Waltz	"The Wisconsin Waltz"	2001	
Cocktail	Brandy Old Fashioned	2023	An image of a Brandy old fashioned cocktail
