= List of New Hampshire state symbols =

Location of New Hampshire in the United States

The U.S. state of New Hampshire has several official symbols.

== Insignia ==
Type	Symbol	Year	Image
Flag	Flag of New Hampshire	1931	New Hampshire flag
Seal	Seal of New Hampshire	1931	Seal of New Hampshire
Emblem	New Hampshire State Emblem	1945	New Hampshire State Emblem
Motto	Live Free or Die	1945	
Nickname	The Granite State		
Highway sign	Number of route within an outline of the Old Man of the Mountain		
Quarter reverse		2000	

== Species ==
Type	Symbol	Year	Image
Bird	Purple finch Haemorhous purpureus	1957	
Raptor	Red-tailed Hawk; Buteo jamaicensis	2019	
Flower	Purple lilac Syringa vulgaris	1919	
Tree	White birch Betula papyrifera	1947	
Animal	White-tailed deer Odocoileus virginianus	1983	
Freshwater game fish	Brook trout Salvelinus fontinalis	1994	
Dog	Chinook	2009	
Saltwater game fish	Striped bass Morone saxatilis	1994	
Insect	Ladybug; Coccinellidae	1977	
Fruit	Pumpkin	2006	
Wildflower	Pink lady's slipper Cypripedium acaule	1990	
Amphibian	Red-spotted newt Notophthalmus viridescens	1985	
Butterfly	Karner Blue; Plebejus melissa samuelis	1992	
Poultry	New Hampshire Red	2018	
Berry	Blackberry	2017	
Spider	Daring Jumping Spider	2021	
Marsupial	Virginia opossum (renamed "New Hampshire Opossum")	2025	

== Geology ==
Type	Symbol	Year	Image
Mineral	Beryl	1985	
Gem	Smokey quartz	1985	
Rock	Granite	1985	

== Culture ==
Type	Symbol	Year	Image
Song	"Old New Hampshire"	1947	
Sport	Skiing	1998	
Tartan	New Hampshire state tartan	1995	
