= List of U.S. state and territory plants and botanical gardens =

This is a list of U.S. state and territory plants and botanical gardens — plants and botanical gardens which have been designated as an official symbol(s) by a state or territory's legislature. 5 U.S. states and 1 U.S. territory have an official state/territory plant. 7 U.S. states have an official state botanical garden or arboretum. This list excludes state flowers, state trees, and state grasses.

== State and territory plants ==
State or territory	Name	Image
American Samoa	ʻAva / Kava (Piper methysticum)	
Georgia	Franklinia (Franklinia alatamaha)	
Hawaiʻi	Kalo / Taro (Colocasia esculenta)	
Louisiana	Creole tomato (state vegetable plant)	
North Carolina	Venus flytrap (Dionaea muscipula) (state carnivorous plant)	
Pennsylvania	Penngift crownvetch (Securigera varia) (state beautification and conservation plant)	
Texas	Prickly pear cactus (Opuntia)	

== State botanical gardens and arboretums ==
State	Botanical garden or aboretum	Image
Georgia	State Botanical Garden of Georgia	
Kentucky	Bernheim Arboretum and Research Forest (state arboretum)	
Kentucky	University of Kentucky Arboretum (state botanical garden)	
Montana	University of Montana at Missoula Campus (state arboretum)	
North Carolina	North Carolina Arboretum	
Pennsylvania	Morris arboretum and gardens	
South Carolina	South Carolina Botanical Garden	
Tennessee	University of Tennessee Botanical Gardens	
Washington	Washington Park Arboretum	

== Other state plant designations ==
State	Herb, shrub, or lichen	Image
California	Lace lichen (Ramalina menziesii) (state lichen)	
Colorado	Claret cup cactus (Echinocereus triglochidiatus) (state cactus)	Echinocereus triglochidiatus
Delaware	Sweet goldenrod (Solidago odora) (state herb)	
Maine	Wintergreen (state herb)	
New York	Lilac (Syringa vulgaris) (state bush)	
Texas	Crape myrtle (Lagerstroemia indica) (state shrub)	
Texas	Purple sage (Leucophyllum frutescens) (state native shrub)	
Wyoming	Wyoming big sagebrush (Artemisia tridentata wyomingensi) (state shrub)	

== State lei-making material ==
In addition to Hawaii's state plant, Hawaii has official state flowers and lei-making material for the individual islands of Hawaii:

Island	Flower or lei-making material	Image
Hawaiʻi island	ʻŌhiʻa lehua / Pua lehua (Metrosideros polymorpha)	
Maui	Lokelani / Damask rose (Rosa × damascena)	
Oʻahu	Pua ʻilima (Sida fallax)	
Kauaʻi	Mokihana berry (Melicope anisata)	
Molokaʻi	Pua kukui (Aleurites moluccanus)	
Lānaʻi	Kaunaʻoa (Cuscuta sandwichiana)	
Niʻihau	Shells (not a plant)	
Kahoʻolawe	Hinahina (Heliotropium anomalum var. argenteum)	

== See also ==
- List of U.S. state and territory flowers
- List of U.S. state and territory trees
- List of U.S. state grasses
- Lists of U.S. state insignia
- Lists of U.S. state symbols
- Arbor Day Foundation
