= List of Guam territorial symbols =

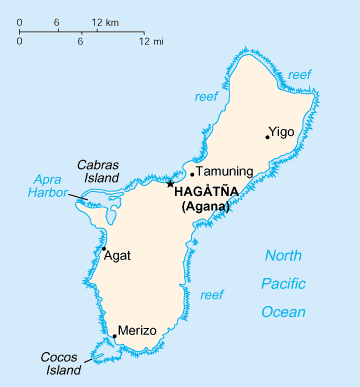
Map of Guam

This is a list of Guam territorial symbols:

Type	Symbol	Year	Image
Flag	The Flag of Guam	February 9, 1948	
Seal	The Seal of Guam	1946	
Nickname	Nicknames: Tano y Chamorro (Land of the Chamorro); Hub of the Pacific; Gateway to Micronesia		
Song	"Stand Ye Guamanians"	1919	
Bird	Guam rail		
Flower	Bougainvillea spectabilis	1968	
Quarter	Quarter of Guam	May 26, 2009	
License Plate	License Plate of Guam	2009	
Tree	Intsia bijuga	1969	

Guam main highway sign
