= List of Northern Mariana Islands territorial symbols =

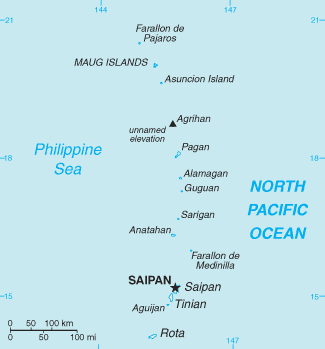
Map of Northern Mariana Islands

This is a list of Northern Mariana Islands territorial symbols:

Type	Symbol	Year	Image
Flag	The Flag of the Northern Mariana Islands	July, 1985	
Seal	The Seal of the Northern Mariana Islands	1981	
Nickname	Nicknames: Håfa Adai (a Chamorro phrase; in English, it is "Hello") (currently used on Northern Mariana Islands license plates); America's Best Kept Secret		
Song	"Gi Talo Gi Halom Tasi"	1996	
Bird	Mariana fruit dove		
Flower	Plumeria	1968	
Quarter	Quarter of the Northern Mariana Islands	November 30, 2009	
License Plate	License Plate of the Northern Mariana Islands	1989	
Tree	Delonix regia	1979	

Northern Mariana Islands main highway sign
