= Peanut Monument =

Peanut Monument may refer to:

- State Peanut Monument (List of Georgia state symbols) in Turner County, Georgia on the west side of Interstate Highway 75 within the limits of the city of Ashburn, Georgia
- Peanut Monument at the Dothan, Alabama Visitor Information Center, proclaiming Dothan as the "Peanut Capital of the World"
