= List of U.S. Virgin Islands territorial symbols =

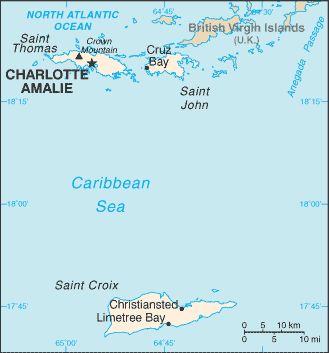
Map of U.S. Virgin Islands

This is a list of U.S.A. Virgin Islands territorial symbols:

Type	Symbol	Year	Image
Flag	The Flag of the United States Virgin Islands	May 17, 1921	
Seal	The Seal of the United States Virgin Islands	1917	
Nickname	No official nickname. Unofficial nickname: American Paradise		
Song	"Virgin Islands March"	1963	
Bird	Bananaquit	1970	
Flower	Tecoma stans	1968	
Quarter	Quarter of U.S. Virgin Islands	November 30, 2009	
License Plate	License Plate of the U.S. Virgin Islands	2017	
Tree	Tecoma stans		

U.S. Virgin Islands main highway sign
