= Flag of Wisconsin =

U.S. state flag

Wisconsin
- Use: Civil and state flag
- Proportion: 2:3
- Adopted: 1863; 163 years ago Standardized: 1913; 113 years ago Revised: May 1, 1981; 45 years ago
- Design: The state coat of arms on a royal blue field with the state's name above and the year 1848 below, both in white.

The flag of the U.S. state of Wisconsin was first adopted in 1863, and was modified in 1979. It is a blue flag charged with the state coat of arms of Wisconsin.

== Statute ==
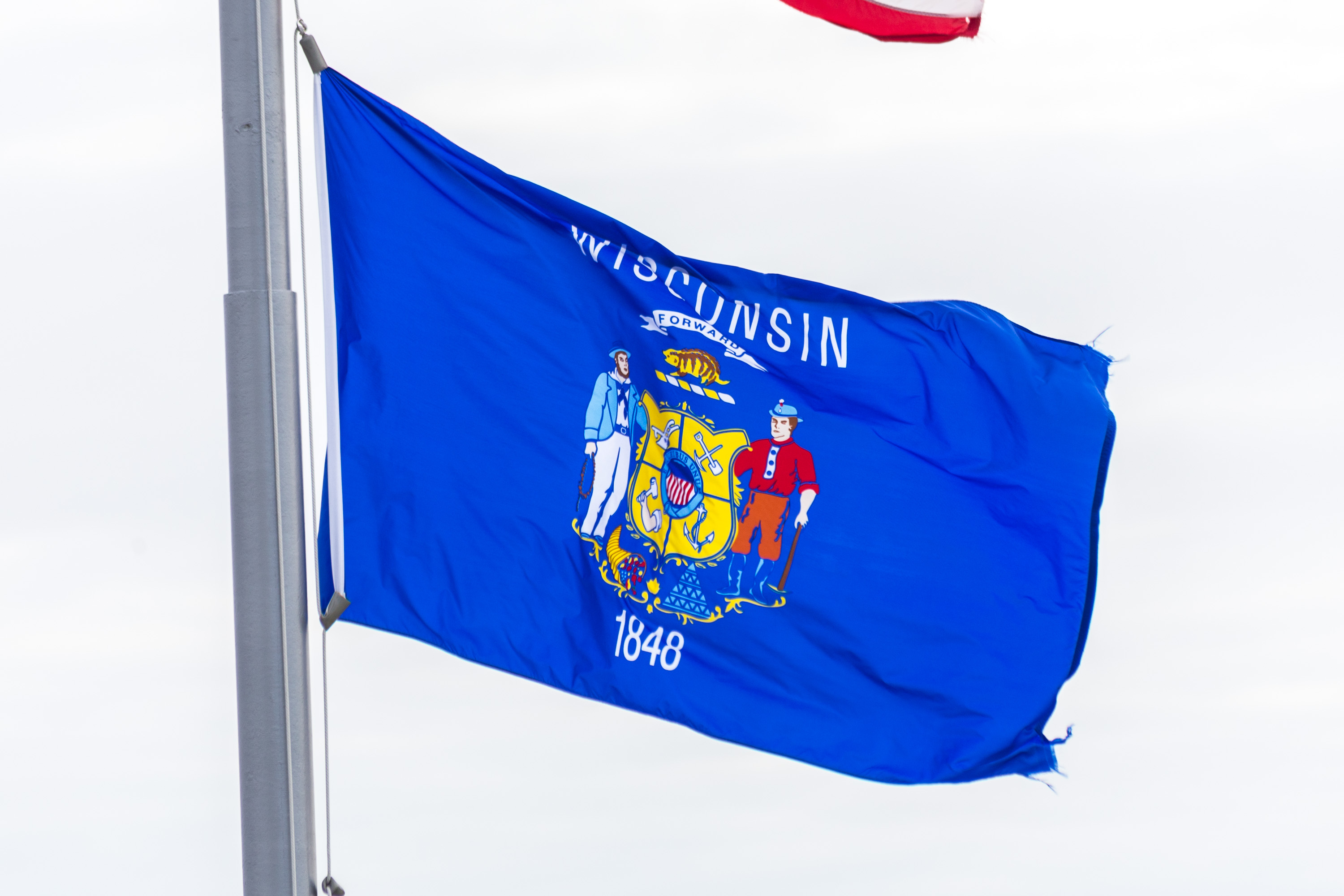
The state flag flies in front of the state capitol

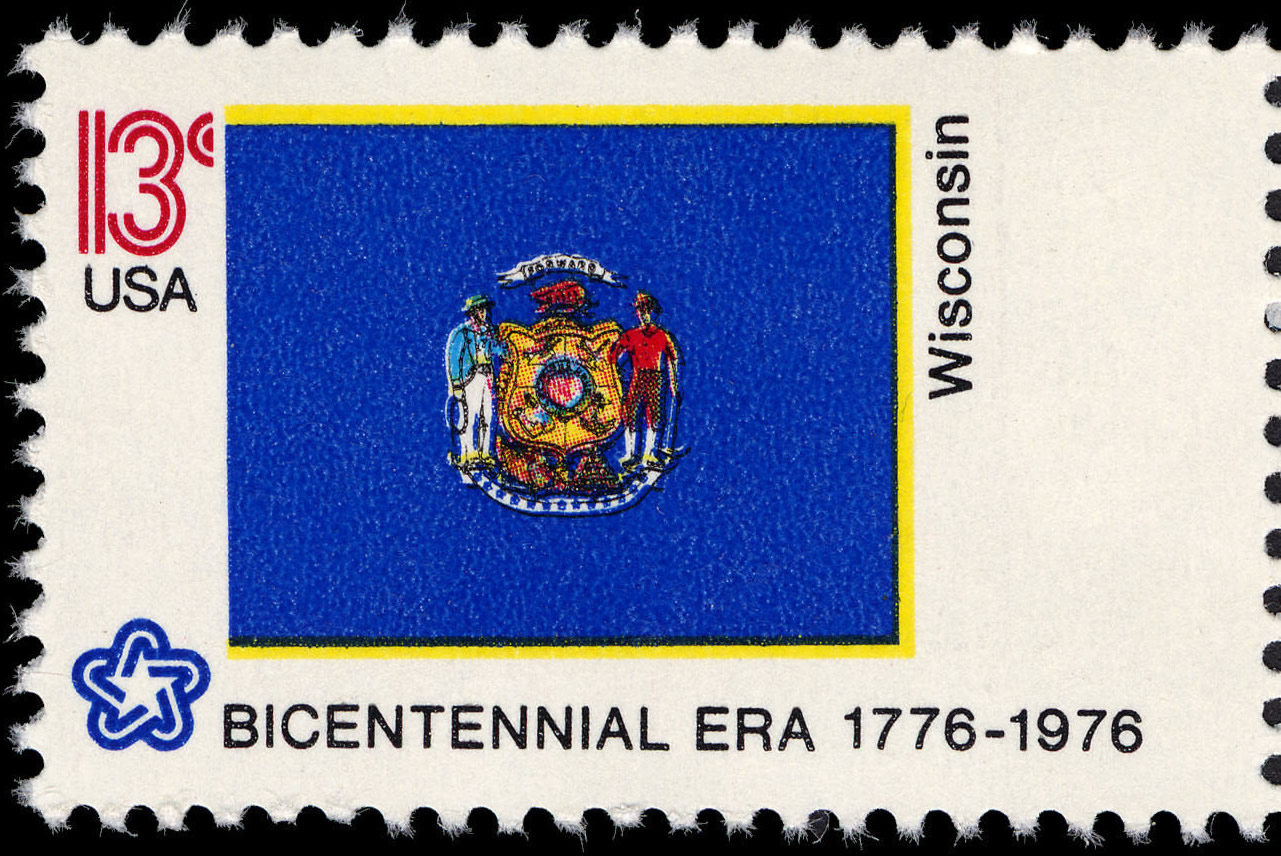
The Wisconsin (1913–1981) state flag as depicted in the 1976 bicentennial postage stamp series.

The 2024 Wisconsin Statutes & Annotations, Chapter 1, § 1.08, defines the flag as follows:

(a) Relative dimensions of 2 to 3, hoist to fly.

(b) A background of royal blue cloth.

(c) The state coat of arms, as described under s. 1.07, in material of appropriate colors, applied on each side in the center of the field, of such size that, if placed in a circle whose diameter is equal to 50 percent of the hoist, those portions farthest from the center of the field would meet, but not cross, the boundary of the circle.

(d) The word "WISCONSIN" in white, capital, condensed Gothic letters, one-eighth of the hoist in height, centered above the coat of arms, midway between the uppermost part of the coat of arms and the top edge of the flag.

(e) The year "1848" in white, condensed Gothic numbers, one-eighth of the hoist in height, centered below the coat of arms, midway between the lowermost part of the coat of arms and the bottom edge of the flag.

(f) Optional trim on the edges consisting of yellow knotted fringe.

=== Design of the coat of arms ===
The Wisconsin Statutes & Annotations § 1.07 (2024) defines the state Coat of Arms as:

Arms: Or, quartered, the quarters bearing respectively a plow, a crossed shovel and pick, an arm and held hammer, and an anchor, all proper; the base of shield resting upon a horn of plenty and pyramid of pig lead, all proper; over all, on fesse point, the arms and motto of the United States, namely: Arms, palewise of 13 pieces argent and gules; a chief azure; motto (on garter surrounding inescutcheon), "E pluribus unum".

Crest: A badger, passant, proper.

Supporters: Dexter, a sailor holding a coil of rope, proper; sinister, a yeoman resting on a pick, proper.

Motto: Over crest, "Forward".

== Design and symbolism ==
Similar to several other U.S. state flags, the Wisconsin state flag features a blue field with the state coat of arms in the center. The year of admission, 1848, is written in white letters below the coat of arms, and a badger, the state animal, along with the state motto "Forward" sits above. The shield contains a plow representing farming, a crossed pick and shovel for mining, an arm holding a hammer for manufacturing, and an anchor for navigation, with the United States coat of arms at its center. The shield is supported by a sailor and a yeoman, representing labor on water and land, and rests atop a cornucopia and a pyramid of pig lead, symbolizing abundance and mineral wealth.

The North American Vexillological Association (NAVA) conducted a survey in 2001 that ranked Wisconsin's flag as one of the worst in design. Amongst the 72 U.S. state, U.S. territorial and Canadian provincial flags, Wisconsin's ranked 65th (8th worst).

== History ==
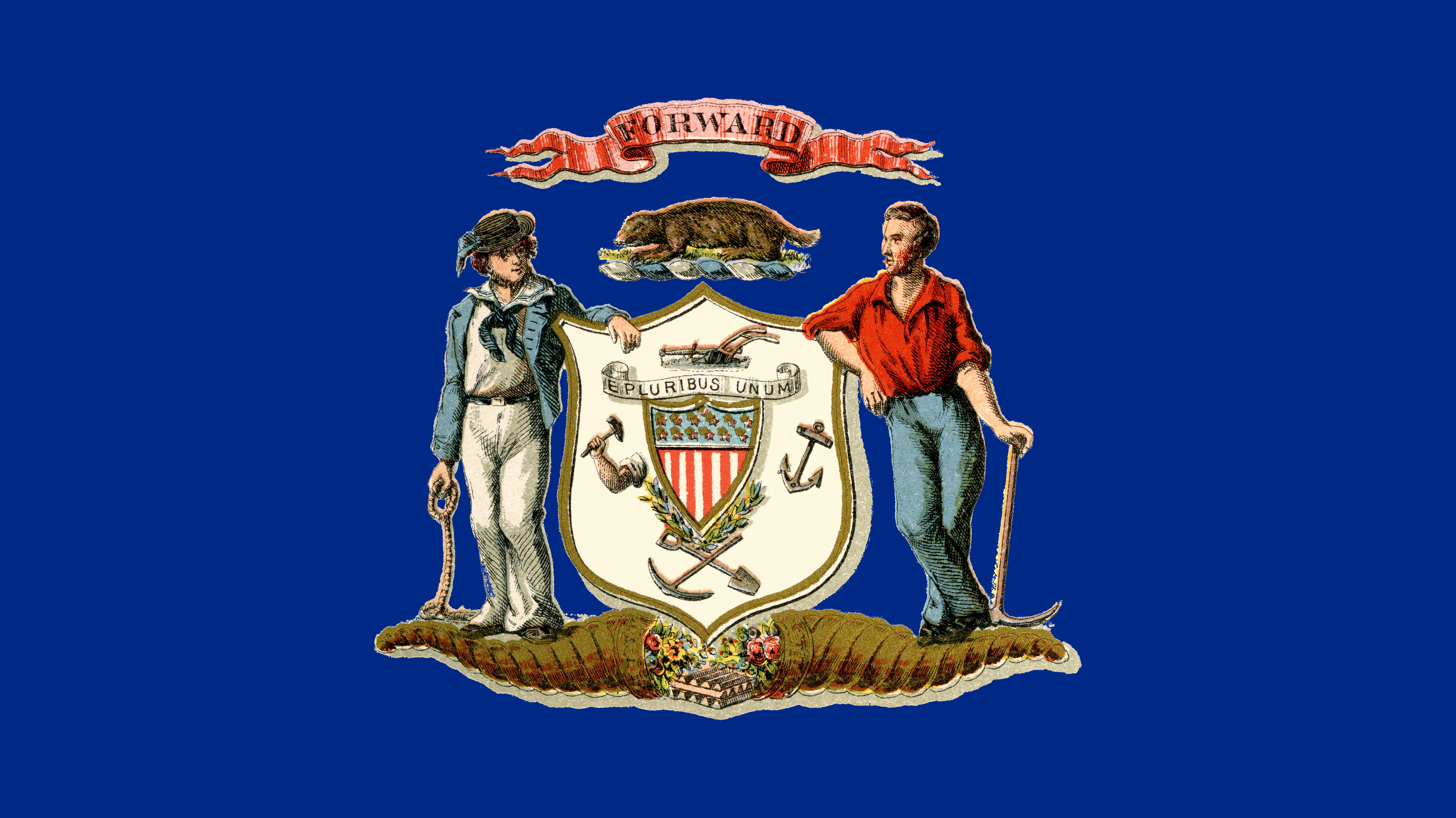
State flag from 1866 to 1913 (obverse)

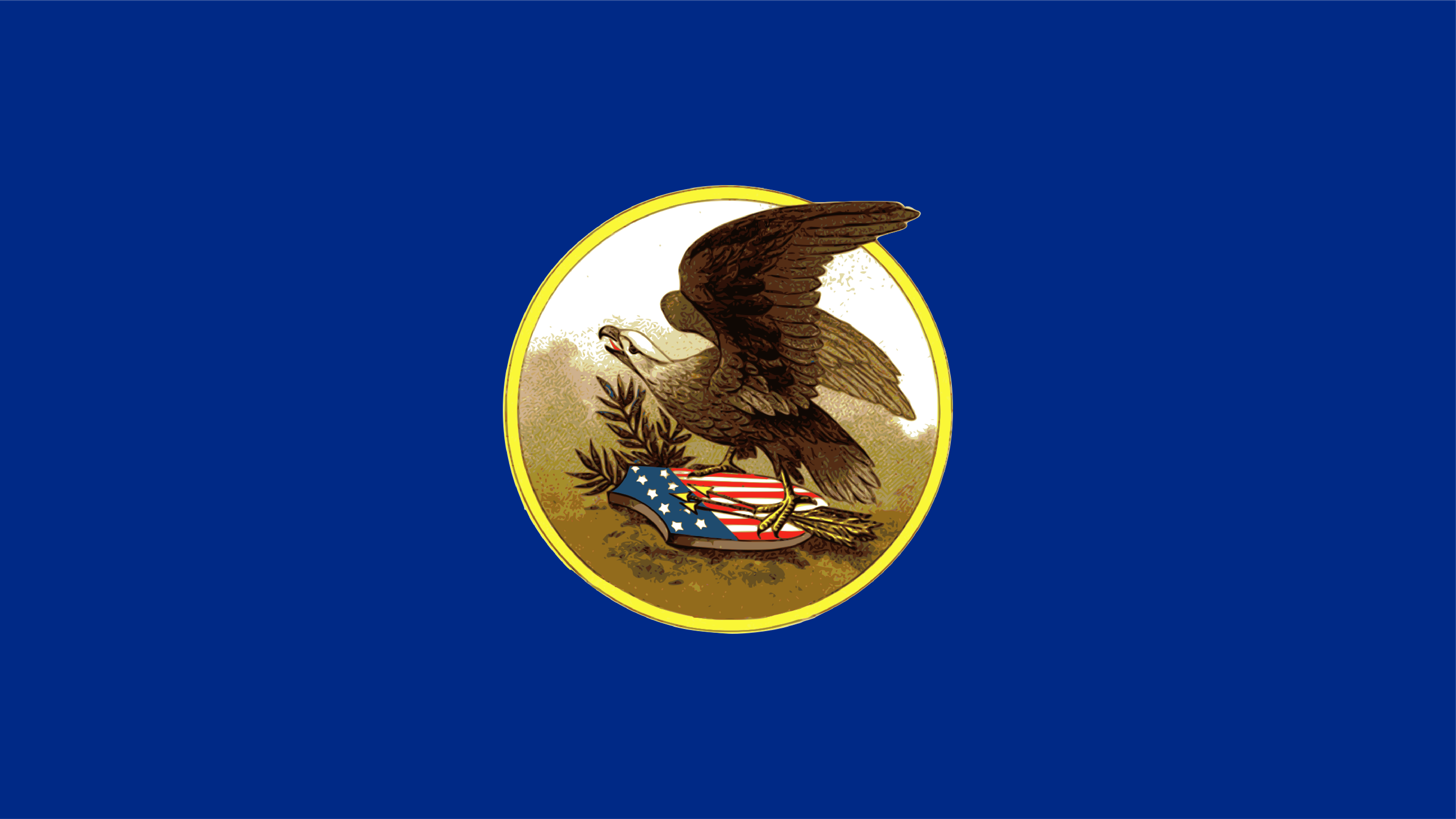
State flag from 1866 to 1913 (reverse)

The flag of Wisconsin was adopted in 1863, through Joint Resolution 4, following requests from Civil War regiments for battlefield use. The legislature formed a committee to choose the specifications for the flag, which was the state coat of arms centered on a field of dark blue. This design was similar to the ones in use by regiments.

By 1869 a new state flag was made for the senate chamber in Madison. It was described similarly to the 1863 flag, but with the United States coat of arms on the back.

State flag as described in 1886

On August 3, 1886 in San Francisco a veterans parade was being held. A group of veterans from Wisconsin carried a state flag describes as: "...banner of crimson, and blue velvet, surcharged with the State arms..."

State flag from 1913 to 1981

In 1913, it was formally added to the Wisconsin Statues, which specified the design of the state flag.

In 1941, Carl R. Eklund reported that he raised the state flag over Antarctica, at the behest of Wisconsin Governor Julius P. Heil, about 500 miles north of the South Pole and 620 miles into a previously unexplored area. In 1958, Eklund flew another flag over Antarctica which he presented for display in a state museum.

In 1953, state assemblyman William N. Belter of Wautoma criticized the flag as too costly because of the details.

Astronaut Jim Lovell, who grew up in Milwaukee, carried Wisconsin flags with him on at least two of his space flights; one aboard Gemini 7 in 1965 and another on Apollo 13. The Gemini 7 flag was presented to Governor Warren Knowles in a ceremony at the state capitol the following year, and the Apollo 13 flag was sold at auction in 2021.

In 1973, when the state senate was attempting to add the word Wisconsin to the flag, it was criticized as already too cluttered.

In 1975, some state flags were being sold that improperly had the state seal on them instead of the state coat of arms. Wisconsin Secretary of State Douglas J. La Follette noted that the correct state flag did not have the banner of thirteen stars at the bottom.

In order to distinguish it from the many other blue U.S. state flags, Wisconsin's flag was modified in 1979 to add "Wisconsin" and "1848", the year Wisconsin was admitted to the Union. The legislation specified that the new design was to take effect on May 1, 1981, and all Wisconsin state flags manufactured after that date were required to use the modified design.

=== Other variants of the state flag ===
Unofficial 1913 to 1981 variant featuring a banner of stars on the bottom.

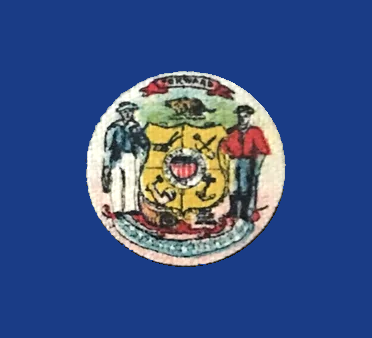
Unofficial 1913 to 1981 variant featuring the coat of arms on a white disc.

Unofficial 1975 variant featuring more of the state seal.

Unofficial 1913 to 1981 variant featuring a gold ring around the state seal

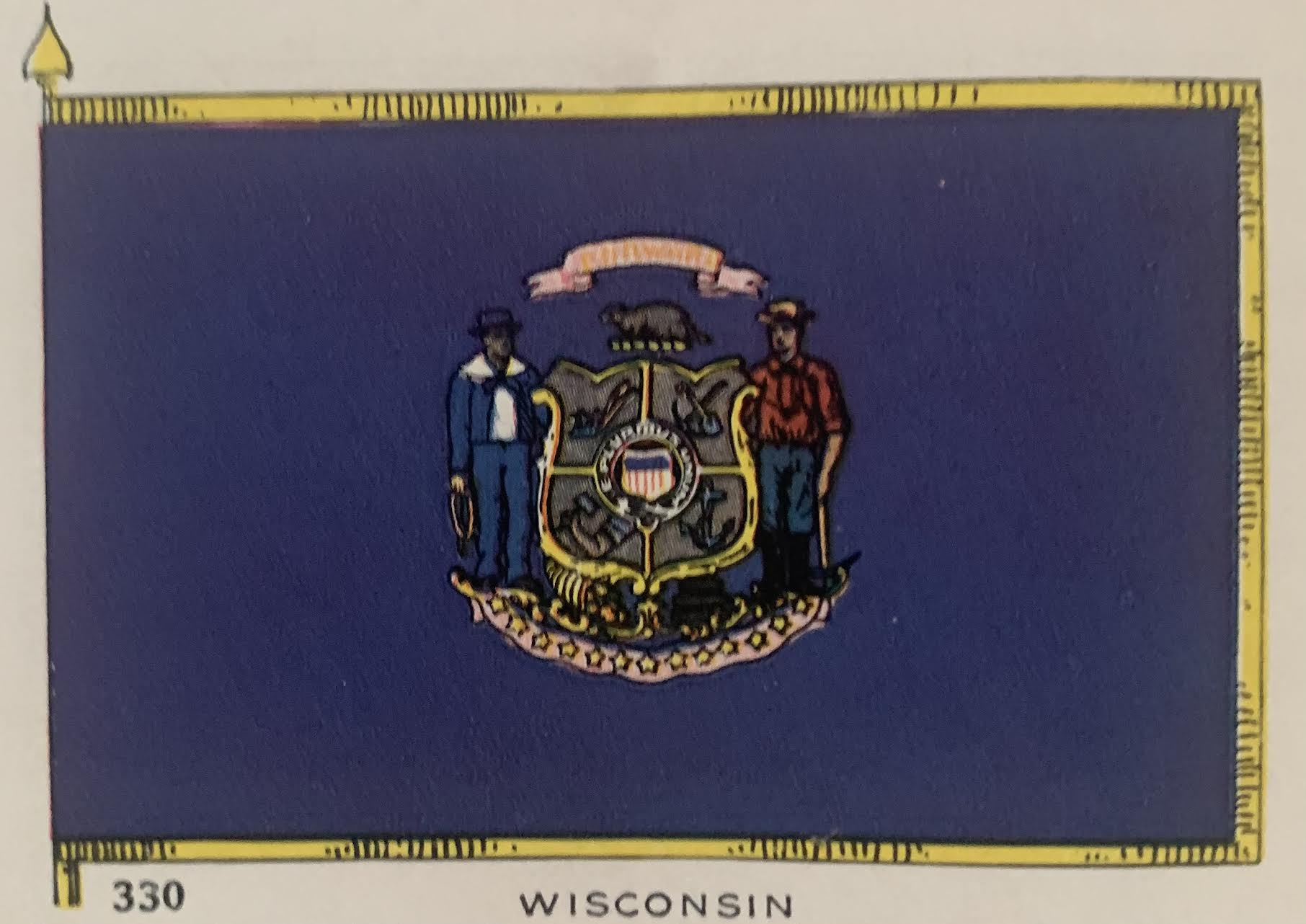
The flag as depicted in National Geographic, 1917, with a pink banner and gold stars

== See also ==
- Symbols of the State of Wisconsin
