= List of Puerto Rico symbols =

This is a list of official symbols of Puerto Rico.

== Symbol or Emblem ==
Type	Symbol	Date	Image
Flag	Flag of Puerto Rico	1952	
Seal	Seal of Puerto Rico	1976	
Coat of arms	Coat of arms of Puerto Rico	1976	
Song	"La Borinqueña" :La Borinqueña Revolucionaria	1977	
Motto	Joannes Est Nomen Ejus (Latin for "John is his name")	1905 (Note: Joannes Est Nomen Ejus (Latin for "John is his name") appears on the Coat of arms of Puerto Rico.)	
Nickname	Isla del Encanto (Spanish for "Island of Enchantment")	De facto (Note: Isla del Encanto (Spanish for "Island of Enchantment"), the de facto nickname of Puerto Rico, is featured on the vehicle registration plates of Puerto Rico since 1987.)	
Flower	Maga	2019	
Tree	Ceiba	De facto (Note: The Ceiba is the de facto national tree of Puerto Rico.)	
Amphibian	Coquí	De facto (Note: The Coquí is the animal most popularly recognized as a national symbol of Puerto Rico. It is a de facto national symbol of Puerto Rico.)	
Bird	Iguaca	De facto (Note: The Iguaca or Puerto Rican parrot is the de facto national bird of Puerto Rico, as it is the most recognized native bird of Puerto Rico. No bird has been officially declared by law. However, the legislative assembly of Puerto Rico approved the Puerto Rican tody as the official national bird of the archipelago in 2022. The proposal is pending on the scientific renaming of the bird as Todus borinquensis by the International Commission on Zoological Nomenclature (ICZN). In 2001, the legislature passed a bill designating the pitirre, but the governor vetoed the bill because it is not endemic to Puerto Rico.)	
Mammal	Manatee	2011	
Beverage	Piña Colada	1978	

== See also ==
- Governors of Puerto Rico
