= New Hampshire state tartan =

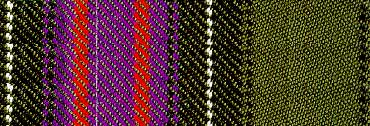
New Hampshire State Tartan

The New Hampshire state tartan is the official tartan of the U.S. state of New Hampshire, codified at New Hampshire Revised Statutes Annotated Section 3:21 (1995).

== History ==
In 1993, handweaver Ralf Hartwell of Newton decided that the state needed a tartan for the 20th anniversary of the New Hampshire Highland Games in 1995. Hartwell designed a tartan with unique color tones, which require special dye lots to be prepared for the coloring process. The Tartan Educational and Cultural Association and International Association of Tartan Studies reviewed and verified the tartan design as original and authentic. The IATS–TECA registration of this tartan was later merged into the database of the Scottish Tartans Authority, and thence subsumed into the Scottish Register of Tartans in 2009.

State Representative Stephen Avery arranged for Governor Stephen Merrill to proclaim the tartan as the state tartan of New Hampshire in June 1994. In January 1995, Avery introduced a bill in the New Hampshire General Court for permanent recognition of the tartan, which was signed into law in May 1995.

In 2019, Joshua Auger and Andrew Richardson procured the rights to the tartan on behalf of NHSCOT, after a lack of production for over 15 years. NHSCOT is the state's largest Scottish cultural organization and host of the New Hampshire Highland Games. NHSCOT commenced production immediately with Lochcarron of Scotland, assuring the availability of the tartan to the public for decades to come. Yardage and tartan accessories can be purchased from NHSCOT, and a portion of every New Hampshire Tartan sale will be designated to the NHSCOT Fund to be used for grants and scholarships.

== Sett ==
The thread count for the sett of the tartan is:

green 56; black 2; green 2; black 12; white 2; black 12; purple 2; black 2; purple 8; red 6; and purple 28

The colors represent the following:

- Purple represents the purple finch and the purple lilac, the state bird and the state flower
- Green represents the green of the forests
- Black represents the granite mountains
- White represents the snow
- Red represents all state heroes
