= University of Tennessee Botanical Gardens =

Botanical gardens across the State of Tennessee

The University of Tennessee Gardens are botanical gardens located across the State of Tennessee. They are part of the University of Tennessee Institute of Agriculture.

== See also ==
- List of botanical gardens in the United States
