= List of U.S. state instruments =

This is a list of official state instruments. Michigan's Instrument is the Appalachian Dulcimer

State	Instrument	Image	Date & Citation
Arkansas	Fiddle		1985
Hawaii	Ukulele (ʻauana/contemporary musical instrument)		2015
Hawaii	Pahu (kahiko/traditional musical instrument)		2015
Kentucky	Appalachian dulcimer		2001
Kentucky	"Mighty Wurlitzer" organ (theater pipe organ)		2005
Louisiana	Cajun accordion		1990
Missouri	Fiddle		1987
New Mexico	New Mexico sunrise guitar (guitar)		2009
Oklahoma	Fiddle (musical instrument)		1984
Oklahoma	Drum (percussive instrument)		1993
South Dakota	Fiddle		1989
Texas	Guitar		1997
