= List of U.S. state toys =

A map showing the states with official state toys marked in red and those with proposed designations marked in yellow.

State toys have been proposed and designated in U.S. state legislatures.

== State toys ==
State	Toy	Date	Reference
Mississippi	Teddy bear	March 13, 2003	

A proposal was presented to the Pennsylvania General Assembly on September 5, 2001 to make the Slinky the official state toy, but it was not passed. Efforts to officially recognize the Slinky as an official symbol of Pennsylvania have continued.
