= List of U.S. state mammals =

A state mammal is the official mammal of a U.S. state as designated by a state's legislature. The first column of the table is for those denoted as the state mammal, and the second shows the state marine mammals. Animals with more specific designations are also listed. Many states also have separately officially designated state birds, state fish, state butterflies, state reptiles, and other animals. Listed separately are state dogs and state horses.

== State mammals ==
Key: Years in parentheses denote the year of adoption by the state's legislature.

List of U.S. state mammals and related mammalian designations
State	Mammal	Marine mammal	Other mammal 1	Other mammal 2	Other mammal 3
Alabama	American black bear (2006)	West Indian manatee (2009)			
Alaska		Bowhead whale (1983)	Moose (land mammal) (1998)		
Arizona	Ringtail (1986)				
Arkansas	White-tailed deer (1993)				
California	California grizzly bear (animal) (1953) (Note: The California Grizzly was declared extinct in 1924.)	Gray whale (1975)			
Colorado	Rocky Mountain bighorn sheep (animal) (1961)				
Connecticut		Sperm whale (animal) (1975)			
Delaware	Gray fox (wildlife animal) (2010)				
District of Columbia	Big brown bat (2020)				
Florida	Florida panther (animal) (1982)	Manatee (marine mammal) (1975)	Porpoise or dolphin (salt water mammal) (1975)		
Georgia	White-tailed deer (2015)	Right whale (1985)			
Hawaii	Hawaiian monk seal (2008)	Humpback whale (1979)	Hawaiian hoary bat (land mammal) (2015)		
Idaho					
Illinois	White-tailed deer (1980)				
Indiana					
Iowa	Muskrat (proposed)				
Kansas	American bison (animal) (1955)				
Kentucky	Gray squirrel (wild game animal) (1968)				
Louisiana	Black bear (1992)				
Maine	Moose (animal) (1979)		Maine Coon Cat (cat) (1985)		
Maryland			Calico Cat (cat) (2001)	Chesapeake Bay Retriever (dog)	
Massachusetts		Right whale (1980)	Tabby Cat (cat) (1988)	Ms. G (groundhog) (2014)	Morgan Horse (1970)
Michigan			White-tailed deer (game mammal) (1997)		
Minnesota	White-tailed deer (proposed) Black bear (proposed) Eastern wolf (proposed) Thirteen-lined ground squirrel (proposed)				
Mississippi	White-tailed deer (1974) Red fox (1997)		Bottlenosed dolphin (1974) (water mammal)		
Missouri	Missouri mule (animal) (1995)				
Montana	Grizzly bear (1983)				
Nebraska	White-tailed deer (1981)				
Nevada	Desert bighorn sheep (animal) (1973)				
New Hampshire	White-tailed deer (1983)		Bobcat (wildcat) (2015)		
New Jersey					
New Mexico	American black bear (1963)				
New York	Beaver (1975)				
North Carolina	Eastern gray squirrel (1969)		Virginia opossum (marsupial) (2013)		
North Dakota					
Ohio	White-tailed deer (1988)				
Oklahoma	Buffalo (1972)			Mexican free-tailed bat (Tadarida brasiliensis)	White-tailed deer (game animal) (1990)
Oregon	Beaver (animal) (1969)				
Pennsylvania	White-tailed deer (1959)				
Rhode Island		Harbor seal (2016)			
South Carolina	White-tailed deer (1972)	Bottlenose dolphin (2009)	Right whale (migratory marine mammal) (2009)	Mule (heritage work animal) (2010)	
South Dakota	Coyote (animal)				
Tennessee	Raccoon (animal) (1971)				
Texas			Armadillo (small mammal) (1995)	Texas Longhorn (large mammal) (1995)	Mexican free-tailed bat (flying mammal) (1995)
Utah	Rocky Mountain elk (animal) (1971)				
Vermont			Randall Lineback (heritage livestock breed) (2005)		
Virginia			Virginia big-eared bat (bat) (2005)		
Washington		Orca (2005)	Olympic marmot (endemic mammal) (2009)		
West Virginia	American black bear (animal) (1973)				
Wisconsin	American badger (animal) (1957)		White-tailed deer (wildlife animal) (1957)	Dairy cow (domestic animal) (1971) (Note: The Holstein-Friesian breed was the state dairy cow from 1972 to 1973. A different purebred breed is designated the "Cow of the Year" every June 1st, with the seven breeds taking turns.)	
Wyoming	American bison (1985)				

== See also ==
- Lists of United States state symbols
  - Lists of United States state symbols § Flora and fauna
  - List of U.S. state dogs
  - List of U.S. state horses
