= List of U.S. state theaters =

This is a list of official U.S. state theaters:

State	Theater	Designation	Image	Date Designated
Alabama	Alabama Theatre	State theater		1993
California	Pasadena Playhouse	State theater		1937
Georgia	Springer Opera House	State theater		1992
Maryland	Olney Theatre Center	State theater		1978
New Jersey	Paper Mill Playhouse	State theater		1972
North Carolina	Flat Rock Playhouse	State theater		1961
Oklahoma	Lyric Theatre	State theater		2022
Pennsylvania	Walnut Street Theatre	State theater		1999
Tennessee	Tennessee Theatre	State theater		1996
Tennessee	Oak Ridge Playhouse	State community theater		2017
Virginia	Barter Theatre	State theater		1946

== See also ==
- Lists of U.S. state insignia
