= List of U.S. state grasses =

The following is a list of official U.S. state grasses.

== Table ==
| State | State grass | Scientific name | Image | Year adopted |
|---|---|---|---|---|
| California | Purple needlegrass | Nassella pulchra | | 2004 |
| Colorado | Blue grama | Bouteloua gracilis | | 1987 |
| Illinois | Big bluestem (state prairie grass) | Andropogon gerardii | | 1989 |
| Kansas | Little bluestem | Schizachyrium scoparium (Andropogon scoparius) | | 2010 |
| Minnesota | Wild rice (state grain) | Zizania aquatica | | 1977 |
| Missouri | Big bluestem | Andropogon gerardii | | 2007 |
| Montana | Bluebunch wheatgrass | Agropyron spicatum | | 1973 |
| Nebraska | Little bluestem | Schizachyrium scoparium (Andropogon scoparius) | | 1969 |
| Nevada | Indian ricegrass | Oryzopsis hymenoides | | 1977 |
| New Mexico | Blue grama | Bouteloua gracilis | | |
| North Dakota | Western wheatgrass | Pascopyrum smithii (Agropyron smithii) | | |
| Oklahoma | Indian grass | Sorghastrum nutans | | 1972 |
| South Carolina | Indian grass | Sorghastrum nutans | | 2001 |
| South Dakota | Western wheatgrass | Agropyron smithii | | 1970 |
| Texas | Sideoats grama | Bouteloua curtipendula | | 1971 |
| Utah | Indian ricegrass | Oryzopsis hymenoides | | 1990 |
| Washington | Bluebunch wheatgrass | Agropyron spicatum | | 1989 |
| Wisconsin | Corn (state grain) | Zea mays | | 1989 |
| Wyoming | Western wheatgrass | Agropyron smithii | | 2007 |

== See also ==
- Lists of U.S. state insignia
