= List of U.S. state sports =

This is a list of official U.S. state sports as recognized by state legislatures.

== Table ==
| State | Sport | Year Adopted | Designation |
|---|---|---|---|
| Alaska | Dog mushing | 1972 | |
| California | Surfing | 2018 | |
| Colorado | Pack burro racing | 2012 | State summer sport |
| Colorado | Skiing and snowboarding | 2008 | State winter sport |
| Delaware | Bicycling | 2014 | |
| Hawaii | Surfing (heʻe nalu) | 1998 | State individual sport |
| Hawaii | Outrigger canoe paddling (heihei waʻa) | 1986 | State team sport |
| Illinois | Bicycling | 2018 | State exercise |
| Maryland | Jousting | 1962 | State sport |
| Maryland | Lacrosse | 2004 | State team sport |
| Maryland | Walking | 2008 | State exercise |
| Massachusetts | Basketball | 2006 | Sport of the Commonwealth |
| Massachusetts | Volleyball | 2014 | Recreational and team sport of the Commonwealth |
| Michigan | American football | 1972 | |
| Minnesota | Ice hockey | 2009 | |
| Missouri | Archery | 2022 | State sport |
| Missouri | Jumping jack | 2014 | State exercise |
| Montana | Rodeo | 2025 | |
| New Hampshire | Skiing | 1998 | |
| New York | Baseball | 2021 | |
| North Carolina | Stock car racing | 2011 | |
| North Dakota | Curling | 2023 | |
| South Dakota | Rodeo | 2003 | |
| Texas | Rodeo | 1997 | |
| Washington | Pickleball | 2022 | |
| Wyoming | Rodeo | 2003 | |

== See also ==
- Lists of United States state symbols
- National sport
