= List of U.S. state crustaceans =

As of September 2024, ten U.S. states and the District of Columbia have designated state crustaceans:

- Alabama has the brown shrimp, Peneaus aztecus.
- California also has the Dungeness crab, Metacarcinus magister.
- District of Columbia has the Hay's spring amphipod.
- Georgia has the white shrimp.
- Hawaii has the Hawaiian red shrimp (common Hawaiian name ʻōpaeʻula), Halocaridina rubra.
- Louisiana has the freshwater crawfish Procambarus clarkii.
- Maine has the lobster, Homarus americanus.
- Maryland has the blue crab, Callinectes sapidus.
- Oregon has the Dungeness crab, Metacarcinus magister.
- Texas has the Texas Gulf shrimp, Penaeus aztecus, P. setiferus, and P. duorarum.
- Utah has the brine shrimp.

== Louisiana ==
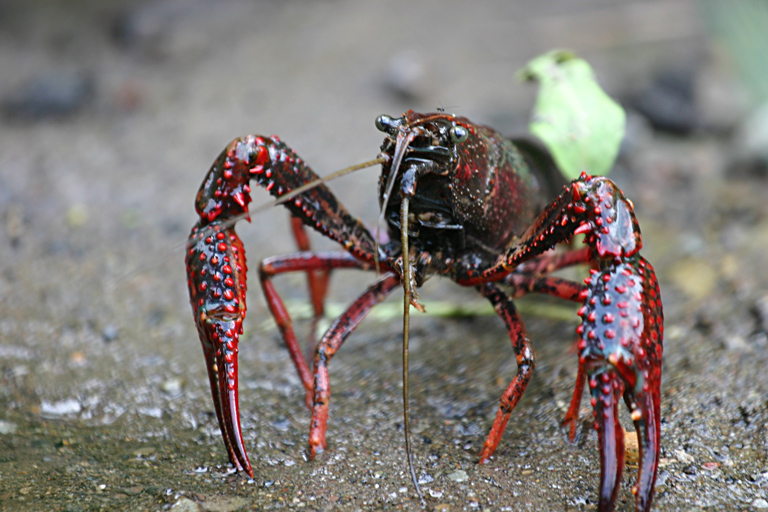
Procambarus clarkii, known as the Louisiana crawfish, is the state crustacean of Louisiana.

In 1983, the state of Louisiana designated the Louisiana crawfish, Procambarus clarkii, as their state crustacean. The native range of P. clarkii is along the Gulf Coast from northern Mexico to the Florida panhandle, as well as inland, to southern Illinois and Ohio. It is most commonly found in warm fresh water, such as slowly flowing rivers, marshes, reservoirs, irrigation systems and rice paddies. P. clarkii grows quickly, and is capable of reaching weights over 50 grams (1.8 oz), and lengths of 5.5–12 centimetres (2.2–4.7 in).

Harvests of P. clarkii account for a large majority of the crawfish produced in the United States. In 1990, Louisiana produced 90% of the crawfish in the world and consumed 70% of it locally, but by 2003, Asian farms and fisheries produced more, outpacing American production rapidly. By 2018, P. clarkii crawfish production in the Americas represented just 4% of total global P. clarkii supply. However, Louisiana crawfish remain in demand locally. In 2018, 93% of crawfish farms in the US were located in Louisiana. Louisiana crawfish are usually boiled in a large pot with heavy seasoning (salt, cayenne pepper, lemon, garlic, bay leaves, etc.) and other items such as potatoes, corn on the cob, onions, garlic, and sausage. There are many differing methods used to season a crawfish boil and an equal number of opinions on which one is correct.

== Maryland ==
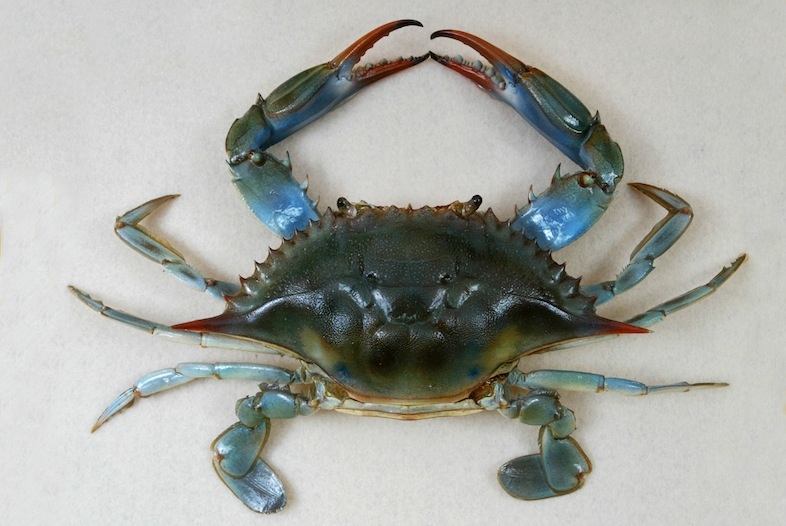
Callinectes sapidus, the blue crab, is the state crustacean of Maryland.

The blue crab, Callinectes sapidus was chosen as the state crustacean of Maryland in 1989. C. sapidus is a crab found in the waters of the western Atlantic Ocean, the Pacific coast of Central America and the Gulf of Mexico. The blue crab may grow to a carapace width of 230 mm (9.1 in). It can be distinguished from a related species that occurs in the same area by the number of frontal teeth on the carapace; C. sapidus has four, while C. ornatus has six.

The Chesapeake Bay, located in Maryland and Virginia, is famous for its blue crabs, and they are one of the most important economic items harvested from it. In 1993, the combined harvest of the blue crabs was valued at around US$100 million. Over the years the population of the blue crab has dropped, and the amount captured has fallen from over 125,000 t (276,000,000 lb) in 1993 to 81,000 t (179,000,000 lb) in 2008. In the Chesapeake Bay, the population fell from 900 million to around 300 million, and capture fell from 52,000 t (115,000,000 lb) in the mid 1990s to 28,000 t (62,000,000 lb) in 2004, with revenue falling from $72 million to $61 million.

== Oregon ==
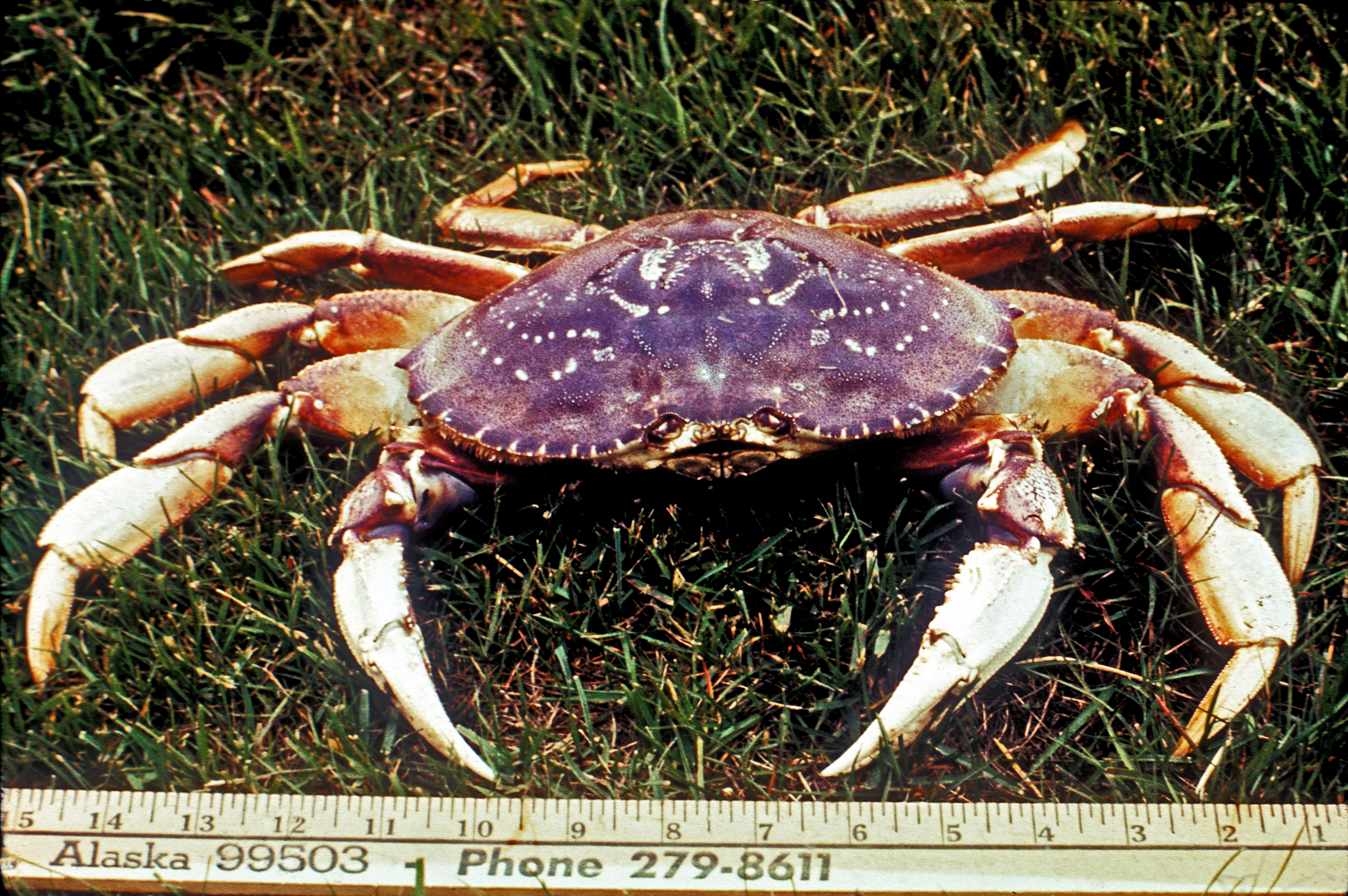
The Dungeness crab, Metacarcinus magister, is the state crustacean of Oregon.

The Dungeness crab, Metacarcinus magister (formerly Cancer magister), is a species of crab that inhabits eelgrass beds and water bottoms on the west coast of North America. Its common name comes from the port of Dungeness, Washington. In 2009, based on lobbying from schoolchildren at Sunset Primary School in West Linn, Oregon, and citing its importance to the Oregon economy, the Oregon State Legislature designated the Dungeness crab as the state crustacean of Oregon.

The carapace width of mature Dungeness crabs may reach 25 cm (9.8 in) in some areas off the coast of Washington, but are typically under 20 cm (7.9 in). They are a popular delicacy, and are the most commercially important crab in the Pacific Northwest, as well as the western states generally. The annual Dungeness Crab and Seafood Festival is held in Port Angeles, Washington each October.
