= List of U.S. state fossils =

Most states in the US have designated a state fossil, many during the 1980s. It is common to designate a fossilized species, rather than a single specimen or a category of fossils. State fossils are distinct from other state emblems like state dinosaurs, state stones, state minerals, state gemstones or state rocks and a state may designate one, a few, or all of those. For example, in Arizona, the state stone is turquoise and the state dinosaur is Sonorasaurus thompsoni yet the state fossil is petrified wood.

The two first states to designate a state fossil were Nebraska and North Dakota, both in 1967.

Six states and the District of Columbia as of March 10th, 2026 still lack an explicit state fossil:

- Arkansas: There is no state fossil in Arkansas, though the state designated Arkansaurus as its state dinosaur.
- District of Columbia: Capitalsaurus is the state dinosaur of Washington D.C., but the District has not chosen a state fossil.
- Florida: There is no state fossil in Florida, though agatised coral, which is a fossil, is the state stone.
- Hawaii: In history, Hawaii is too young to have many fossils, and its igneous composition makes fossils harder to find. The government has not officially declared any of its existing fossils a state fossil.
- Iowa: The crinoid was proposed in 2018, though it was not officially accepted.
- New Hampshire: The American mastodon (Mammut americanum) was considered in 2015.
- Texas: There is no state fossil, though the state dinosaur is Sauroposeidon proteles.

== Table of state fossils ==
State federal district or territory	Age	Common name	Binomial name	Image	Year adopted
Alabama	Eocene	Basilosaurus whale	Basilosaurus cetoides		1984
Alaska	Pleistocene	Woolly mammoth	Mammuthus primigenius		1986
Arizona	Triassic	Petrified wood	Araucarioxylon arizonicum		1988
California	Pleistocene	Saber-toothed cat	Smilodon fatalis		1974
Colorado	Jurassic	Stegosaurus	Stegosaurus armatus		1982
Connecticut	Jurassic	Dinosaur tracks	Eubrontes giganteus		1991
Delaware	Cretaceous	Belemnite	Belemnitella americana		
Georgia	Cretaceous– Miocene	Shark tooth	species not specified		1976
Idaho	Pliocene	Hagerman horse	Equus simplicidens		1988
Illinois	Pennsylvanian	Tully monster	Tullimonstrum gregarium		1989
Indiana	Holocene	American mastodon	Mammut americanum		2022
Kansas	Cretaceous	Pteranodon (state flying fossil)	Pteranodon longiceps		2014
Kansas	Cretaceous	Tylosaurus (state marine fossil)	Tylosaurus kansasensis		2014
Kentucky	Ordovician– Pennsylvanian	Brachiopod	undetermined		1986
Louisiana	Oligocene	Petrified palmwood	Palmoxylon		1976
Maine	Devonian	Pertica plant	Pertica quadrifaria		1976
Maryland	Miocene	Ecphora gardnerae shell	Ecphora gardnerae gardnerae		1984 (name revised, 1994)
Massachusetts	Jurassic	Dinosaur tracks	Eubrontes giganteus		1980
Michigan	Holocene	American mastodon	Mammut americanum		2002
Minnesota	Pleistocene	Giant beaver	Castoroides ohioensis		2025
Mississippi	Eocene	"Prehistoric whale"	Zygorhiza kochii		1981
Missouri	Pennsylvanian	Sea lily	Delocrinus missouriensis		1989
Montana	Cretaceous	Hadrosaur	Maiasaura peeblesorum		1985
Nebraska	Pleistocene	Woolly mammoth Columbian mammoth Imperial mammoth	Mammuthus primigenius Mammuthus columbi Mammuthus imperator		1967
Nevada	Triassic	Ichthyosaur	Shonisaurus popularis		1977 (designated) 1988 (amended)
New Jersey	Cretaceous	Hadrosaur	Hadrosaurus foulkii		1991
New Mexico	Triassic	Coelophysis	Coelophysis bauri		1981
New York	Silurian	Sea scorpion	Eurypterus remipes		1984
North Carolina	Miocene- Pliocene	Shark tooth	Otodus megalodon		2013
North Dakota	Paleocene	Shipworm-bored petrified wood	Teredo petrified wood		1967
Ohio	Ordovician	Trilobite	Isotelus maximus (Fossil invertebrate)		1985
Ohio	Devonian	Dunkleosteus	Dunkleosteus terrelli (Fossil Fish)		2021
Oklahoma	Jurassic	Saurophaganax	Saurophaganax maximus		2000
Oregon	Eocene	Dawn redwood	Metasequoia		2005
Pennsylvania	Devonian	Trilobite	Phacops rana		1988
Rhode Island	Paleozoic	Trilobite	Genus and species not stated		2023
South Carolina	Pleistocene	Columbian mammoth	Mammuthus columbi		2014
South Dakota	Cretaceous	Triceratops	Triceratops horridus		1988
Tennessee	Cretaceous	Bivalve	Pterotrigonia thoracica		1998
Utah	Jurassic	Allosaurus	Allosaurus fragilis		1988
Vermont	Pleistocene	Beluga whale (redesignated as state marine fossil in 2014)	Delphinapterus leucas		1993
Vermont	Pleistocene	Woolly mammoth tooth and tusk (state terrestrial fossil)	Mammuthus primigenius		2014
Virginia	Cenozoic	scallop	Chesapecten jeffersonius		1993
Washington	Pleistocene	Columbian mammoth	Mammuthus columbi		1998
West Virginia	Late Pleistocene	Jefferson's ground sloth	Megalonyx jeffersonii		2008
Wisconsin	Silurian	Trilobite	Calymene celebra		1985
Wyoming	Eocene	Knightia	Knightia spp.		1987

== See also ==
- List of U.S. state dinosaurs
- List of U.S. state minerals, rocks, and gemstones
- Lists of U.S. state insignia
