= List of U.S. state dances =

Many states of the United States have adopted official dances as one of their state symbols. The practice has extended to U.S. territories and Washington, D.C.

Starting in the 1970s, many states adopted square dance as their state dance, the result of a campaign by square dancers to make it the national dance.

== Table ==
State, district, or territory	Dance	Year adopted	Ref.
Alabama	Square dance	1981	
Arkansas	Square dance	1991	
California	West Coast Swing	1988	
California	Square dance (Official folk dance)	1988	
Colorado	Square dance	1992	
Connecticut	Square dance	1995	
Delaware	None (Maypole proposed in 2016–2017 legislative session)		
District of Columbia	Hand dancing	1999	
Georgia	Square dance	1996	
Hawaii	Hula	1999	
Idaho	Square dance	1989	
Illinois	Square dance	1990	
Kentucky	Clogging	2006	
Louisiana	Square dance	1999	
Maryland	Square dance	1994	
Massachusetts	Square dance	1990	
Minnesota	None (Square dance was proposed in 1992 and 1994)		
Mississippi	Square dance	1995	
Missouri	Square dance	1995	
Nebraska	Square dance	1997	
New Jersey	Square dance (Official folk dance)	1983	
North Carolina	Clogging (Official folk dance)	2005	
North Carolina	Carolina shag (Official popular dance)	2005	
North Dakota	Square dance	1995	
Oklahoma	Square dance	1988	
Oregon	Square dance	1977	
Pennsylvania	Polka	1990	
South Carolina	Square dance (State American Folk Dance)	1994	
South Carolina	The Shag	1984	
Tennessee	Square dance	1980	
Texas	Square dance	1994	
Utah	Square dance	1994	
Virginia	Square dance	2011	
Washington	Square dance	1979	
Wisconsin	Polka	1993	

== See also ==
- Lists of U.S. state insignia
- Flags of the U.S. states
