= List of U.S. state foods =

This is a list of official U.S. state foods:

State	Food type	Food name	Image	Year & citation
Alabama	State cookie	Yellowhammer cookie		2023
Alabama	State nut	Pecan		1982
Alabama	State fruit	Blackberry		2004
Alabama	State tree fruit	Peach		2006
Alabama	State cake	Lane cake		2016
Alabama	State vegetable	Sweet potato		2021
Alabama	State legume	Peanut	Peanut	2022
Alabama	State Spirit	Clyde May’s Whiskey		2004
Alaska				None
Arizona	State Drink	Lemonade	Lemonade	2019
Arkansas	State fruit	South Arkansas vine ripe pink tomato		1987
Arkansas	State grain	Rice		2007
Arkansas	State grape	Cynthiana (Vitis aestivalis)		2009
Arkansas	State nut	Pecan		2009
California (Note: In a proclamation as acting governor, Lt. Gov. Gavin Newsom declared the artichoke state vegetable, the avocado state fruit, the almond state nut, and rice state grain. The legislature did not enact these.)	State nut	Almond, walnut, pistachio, and pecan		2017
California	State mushroom	California golden chanterelle		2023
Colorado				None
Connecticut	State food	Pizza		2021
Delaware	State herb	Sweet goldenrod (Solidago odora)		1996
Delaware	State dessert	Peach pie		2009
Delaware	State fruit	Strawberry		2010
District of Columbia	Official fruit	Cherry		2006
Florida	State fruit	Orange		2005
Florida	State pie	Key lime pie		2006
Florida	State honey	Tupelo honey		2016
Georgia (Note: Georgia declared peanuts the state crop.)	State vegetable	Vidalia sweet onion		1990
Georgia	State fruit	Peach		1995
Georgia	State prepared food	Grits		2002
Hawaii (Note: Hawaii's official state plant is kalo (Colocasia esculenta; taro).)				None
Idaho	State fruit	Huckleberry		2000
Idaho	State vegetable	Potato		2002
Illinois	State snack food	Popcorn		2004
Illinois	State fruit	GoldRush Apple (Malus × domestica)		2007
Illinois	State vegetable	Sweet corn		2015
Illinois	State pie	Pumpkin pie		2016
Illinois	State grain	Corn		2018
Illinois	State bean	Soybean		2025
Indiana (Note: Indiana Senate Resolution 59 (2009) made sugar cream pie (renamed "Hoosier Pie") "unofficial state pie" in 2009.)	State snack food	Popcorn		2021
Iowa	State Food	Pork Tenderloin		None
Kansas	State fruit	Sandhill plum		2022
Kentucky	State fruit	Blackberry		2004
Louisiana	State fruit	Louisiana strawberry		1980
Louisiana	State jellies	Mayhaw jelly and Louisiana sugar cane jelly		2003
Louisiana	State meat pie	Natchitoches meat pie		2003
Louisiana	State vegetable	Sweet potato		2003
Louisiana	State cuisine	Gumbo		2004
Maine	State berry	Wild blueberry		1991
Maine	State herb	Wintergreen		1999
Maine	State dessert	Blueberry pie made with wild Maine blueberries		2011
Maine	State treat	Whoopie pie		2011
Maine	State sweetener	Pure Maine maple syrup		2015
Maryland	State dessert	Smith Island Cake		2008
Maryland	State drink	Milk	A glass of milk	1998
Maryland	State crustacean	Blue crab		1989
Massachusetts	State muffin	Corn muffin		1986
Massachusetts	State bean	Baked navy bean		1993
Massachusetts	State berry	Cranberry		1994
Massachusetts	State dessert	Boston cream pie		1996
Massachusetts	State cookie	Chocolate chip cookie		1997
Massachusetts	State doughnut	Boston cream doughnut		2003
Michigan	State native grain	Manoomin	Manoomin	2023
Minnesota	State berry	Blueberry		
Minnesota	State pop (soda)	Orange		
Minnesota	State tree	Red pine		
Minnesota	State grain	Wild rice		1977
Minnesota	State mushroom	Morel		1984
Minnesota	State muffin	Blueberry muffin		1988
Minnesota	State fruit	Honeycrisp apple		2006
Mississippi	State fruit	Blueberry		2023
Missouri	State tree nut	Eastern black walnut (Juglans nigra)		1990
Missouri	State grape	Norton/Cynthiana (Vitis aestivalis)		2003
Missouri	State dessert	Ice cream cone		2008
Montana	State fruit	Huckleberry		2023
Nebraska				None
Nevada				None
New Hampshire	State fruit	Pumpkin		2006
New Hampshire	State vegetable	White potato		2013
New Jersey	State fruit	Northern highbush blueberry		2004
New Jersey	State sandwich	Pork roll egg and cheese (sandwich containing Taylor ham, eggs and cheese,		2023
New Mexico	State vegetable	New Mexico chile (Note: Along with New Mexico chile being one of the state vegetables, New Mexico has adopted three additional chile-related state symbols. • The state question, "Red or green?", was adopted in 2003 and is a reference to choosing between red chile or green chile when ordering New Mexico cuisine. • The state answer, "Red and green or Christmas", was then adopted in 2007. • Most recently, New Mexico's state aroma, "The aroma of green chile roasting", was adopted in 2023.) and pinto beans		1965
New Mexico	State cookie	Bizcochito (Note: Per Section 12-3-4 NMSA 1978, the word is spelled "bizcochito". However, a common alternate spelling is "biscochito".)		1989
New York	State fruit	Apple		1976
New York	State muffin	Apple muffin		1987
New York	State snack	Yogurt		2014
North Carolina	State vegetable	Sweet potato		1995
North Carolina	State blue berry	Blueberry		2001
North Carolina	State red berry	Strawberry		2001
North Carolina	State fruit	Scuppernong grape		2001
North Carolina	State cookie	Moravian cookie		2026
North Dakota	State fruit	Chokecherry		2007
Ohio	State fruit	Tomato		2009
Ohio	State native fruit	Pawpaw		2009
Ohio	State nut	Buckeye		1953
Oklahoma	State meal	Oklahoma state meal: Chicken-fried steak, barbequed pork, fried okra, squash, cornbread, grits, corn, sausage with biscuits and gravy, black-eyed peas, strawberries, and pecan pie		1988
Oklahoma	State fruit	Strawberry		2005
Oklahoma	State vegetable	Watermelon		2007
Oklahoma	State steak	Ribeye		2019
Oregon	State nut	Hazelnut (filbert)		1989
Oregon	State mushroom	Pacific golden chanterelle		1999
Oregon	State fruit	Pear		2005
Oregon	State vegetable	Potato		2023
Oregon	State steak	T-bone steak		2025
Pennsylvania				none
Rhode Island	State fruit	Rhode Island Greening Apple		1991
Rhode Island	State appetizer	Calamari		2015
South Carolina	State fruit	Peach		1984
South Carolina	State snack food	Boiled peanuts		2006
South Carolina	State vegetable	Collard greens		2011
South Carolina	State picnic cuisine	Barbecue		2014
South Dakota	State dessert	Kuchen		2000
South Dakota	State bread	Frybread		2005
Tennessee	State fruit	Tomato		2003
Texas (Note: In 2003, Texas law made sopaipilla and strudel state pastries until 2005.)	State dish	Chili		1977
Texas	State fruit	Texas red grapefruit		1993
Texas	State pepper	Jalapeño		1995
Texas	State native pepper	Chiltepin		1997
Texas	State vegetable	Sweet onion		1997
Texas	State health nut	Native pecan		2001
Texas	State snack	Tortilla chips and salsa		2003
Texas	State bread	Pan de campo		2005
Texas	State cobbler	Peach cobbler		2013
Texas	State pie	Pecan pie		2013
Texas	State squash	Pumpkin		2013
Texas	State mushroom	Texas star	A mushroom that somewhat resembles a dark brown or black cigar before it splits open radially into a starlike arrangement of four to seven leathery rays.	2021
Utah	State fruit	Cherry		1997
Utah	"a favorite snack food"	Jell-O (recognized by a Senate resolution only)		2001
Utah	State historic vegetable	Sugar beet		2002
Utah	State vegetable	Spanish sweet onion		2002
Vermont	State flavor	Maple		1993
Vermont	State fruit	Apple		1999
Vermont	State pie	Apple pie, required by law to be served with: a glass of cold milk, a slice of cheddar cheese weighing a minimum of 1/2 ounce, or a large scoop of vanilla ice cream.		1999
Vermont	State vegetable	Gilfeather Turnip		2015
Virginia				None
Washington	State fruit	Apple		1989
Washington	State vegetable	Walla Walla sweet onion		2007
West Virginia	State fruit	Golden Delicious apple		1995
Wisconsin	State grain	Corn (Zea mays)		1989
Wisconsin	State fruit	Cranberry (Vaccinium macrocarpon)		2003
Wisconsin	State pastry	Kringle		2013
Wisconsin	State dairy product	Cheese		2017
Wyoming				None

== See also ==
- List of U.S. state beverages
