= List of U.S. state fish =

This is a list of official U.S. state fishes:

State	Common name	Scientific name	Image	Year
Alabama	Largemouth bass (freshwater)	Micropterus salmoides		1975
Alabama	Fighting tarpon (saltwater)	Megalops atlanticus		1955
Alaska	King salmon	Oncorhynchus tshawytscha		1962
Arizona	Apache trout	Oncorhynchus gilae (subspecies apache)		1986
Arkansas	Alligator gar (primitive)	Atractosteus spatula		2019
California	Golden trout (freshwater)	Oncorhynchus mykiss (subspecies aguabonita)		1947
California	Garibaldi (saltwater)	Hypsypops rubicundus		1995
Colorado	Greenback cutthroat trout	Oncorhynchus clarkii (subspecies stomias)		1994
Connecticut	American shad	Alosa sapidissima		2003
Delaware	Weakfish	Cynoscion genus		1981
District of Columbia	American shad	Alosa sapidissima	American Shad	
Florida	Florida largemouth bass (freshwater)	Micropterus floridanus		2007
Florida	Atlantic sailfish (saltwater)	Istiophorus albicans		2007
Georgia	Largemouth bass	Micropterus salmoides		1970
Georgia	Southern Appalachian brook trout (cold water game fish)	Salvelinus fontinalis		2006
Georgia	Red drum (saltwater)	Sciaenops ocellatus		2006
Hawaii	Humuhumunukunukuāpuaʻa (Reef triggerfish)	Rhinecanthus rectangulus		2006
Idaho	Cutthroat trout	Oncorhynchus clarkii		1990
Illinois	Bluegill	Lepomis macrochirus		1986
Indiana	none recognized			
Iowa	none recognized			
Kansas	Channel catfish	Ictalurus punctatus		2018
Kentucky	Kentucky spotted bass	Micropterus punctulatus		1956
Louisiana	White crappie (freshwater)	Pomoxis annularis		1993
Louisiana	Spotted sea trout (saltwater)	Cynoscion nebulosus		2001
Maine	Landlocked Atlantic salmon	Salmo salar sebago		1969
Maryland	Rockfish (striped bass)	Morone saxatilis		1965
Maryland	Megalodon (shark)	Otodus megalodon		2026
Massachusetts	Cod	Gadus morhua		1974
Michigan	Brook trout	Salvelinus fontinalis		1988
Minnesota	Walleye	Sander vitreus		1965
Mississippi	Largemouth bass	Micropterus salmoides		1974
Missouri	Channel catfish (fish)	Ictalurus punctatus		1997
Missouri	Paddlefish (aquatic animal)	Polyodon spathula		1997
Montana	Blackspotted cutthroat trout	Oncorhynchus clarkii (subspecies lewisi)		1977
Nebraska	Channel catfish	Ictalurus punctatus		1997
Nevada	Lahontan cutthroat trout	Oncorhynchus clarkii (subspecies henshawi)		1981
New Hampshire	Brook trout (freshwater)	Salvelinus fontinalis		1994
New Hampshire	Striped bass (saltwater game fish)	Morone saxatilis		1994
New Jersey	Brook trout (freshwater)	Salvelinus fontinalis		1991
New Jersey	Striped bass (saltwater game fish)	Morone saxatilis		2017
New Mexico	Rio Grande cutthroat trout	Oncorhynchus clarkii (subspecies virginalis)		2005
New York	Brook trout (freshwater)	Salvelinus fontinalis		1975
New York	Striped bass (marine/saltwater)	Morone saxatilis		2006
North Carolina	Southern Appalachian brook trout (freshwater trout)	Salvelinus fontinalis		2005
North Carolina	Channel bass (saltwater)	Sciaenops ocellatus		1971
North Dakota	Northern pike	Esox lucius		1969
Ohio	None recognized			
Oklahoma	White bass	Morone chrysops		1974
Oregon	Chinook salmon	Oncorhynchus tshawytscha		1961
Pennsylvania	Brook trout	Salvelinus fontinalis		1970
Rhode Island	Striped bass	Morone saxatilis		2000
South Carolina	Striped bass	Morone saxatilis		1972
South Dakota	Walleye	Sander vitreus		1992
Tennessee	Smallmouth bass (sport fish)	Micropterus dolomieu		2005
Tennessee	Channel catfish (state commercial fish)	Ictalurus punctatus		1987
Texas	Guadalupe bass (freshwater)	Micropterus treculii		1989
Texas	Red drum (saltwater)	Sciaenops ocellatus		2011
Utah	Bonneville cutthroat trout	Oncorhynchus clarkii (subspecies utah)		1997
Vermont	Brook trout (cold water)	Salvelinus fontinalis		1978 (2012)
Vermont	Walleye (warm water)	Sander vitreus		1978 (2012)
Virginia	Brook trout (freshwater)	Salvelinus fontinalis		2011
Virginia	Striped bass (saltwater)	Morone saxatilis		2011
Washington	Steelhead trout	Oncorhynchus mykiss		1969
West Virginia	Brook trout	Salvelinus fontinalis		1973
Wisconsin	Muskellunge	Esox masquinongy		1955
Wyoming	Cutthroat trout	Oncorhynchus clarkii		1987

== See also ==
- List of U.S. state, district, and territorial insignia
- Lists of United States state symbols#Flora and fauna
