= List of U.S. state insects =

State insects are designated by 48 individual states of the fifty United States. Some states have more than one designated insect, or have multiple categories (e.g., state insect and state butterfly, etc.). Iowa and Michigan are the two states without a designated state insect.

More than half of the insects chosen are not native to North America, because of the inclusion of two European species (European honey bee and European mantis), the former having been chosen by numerous states.

== Table ==
State	State insect	Binomial name	Image	Year
Alabama	Monarch butterfly (state insect)	Danaus plexippus		1989
Alabama	Queen Honey bee (state agricultural insect)	Apis mellifera		2015
Alabama	Eastern tiger swallowtail (state butterfly and mascot)	Papilio glaucus		1989
Alaska	Four-spotted skimmer dragonfly	Libellula quadrimaculata		1995
Arizona	Two-tailed swallowtail (state butterfly)	Papilio multicaudata		2001
Arkansas	European honey bee (state insect)	Apis mellifera		1973
Arkansas	Diana fritillary butterfly (state butterfly)	Speyeria diana		2007
California	California dogface butterfly (state butterfly)	Zerene eurydice		1972
Colorado	Colorado hairstreak	Hypaurotis crysalus		1996
Connecticut	European mantis	Mantis religiosa		1977
Delaware	Lady bug (state bug)	Coccinellidae		1974
Delaware	Eastern tiger swallowtail (state butterfly)	Papilio glaucus		1999
Delaware	Stonefly (state macroinvertebrate)	Order Plecoptera		2005
Delaware	Blue dasher (state dragonfly)	Pachydiplax longipennis		2025
Florida	Zebra longwing (state butterfly)	Heliconius charitonius		1996
Georgia	European honey bee (state insect)	Apis mellifera		1975
Georgia	Eastern tiger swallowtail (state butterfly)	Papilio glaucus		1988
Hawaii	Kamehameha butterfly	Vanessa tameamea		2009
Idaho	Monarch butterfly	Danaus plexippus		1992
Illinois	Monarch butterfly	Danaus plexippus		1975
Illinois	Black and Gold Bumble Bee (state bee)	Bombus auricomus	A black and gold bumble bee is on the flower head of wild bergamot, drinking nectar	2026
Indiana	Say's firefly	Pyractomena angulata		2018
Kansas	European honey bee	Apis mellifera		1976
Kentucky	European honey bee (state agricultural insect)	Apis mellifera		2010
Kentucky	Viceroy butterfly (state butterfly)	Limenitis archippus		1990
Louisiana	European honey bee (state insect)	Apis mellifera		1977
Louisiana	Gulf fritillary (state butterfly)	Dione vanillae	Large orange butterfly with large white spots bordered in black, nectaring on small purple flowers	2022
Maine	European honey bee (state insect)	Apis mellifera		1975
Maine	Pink-edged Sulphur (state butterfly)	Colias interior		2023
Maryland	Baltimore checkerspot butterfly	Euphydryas phaeton		1973
Massachusetts	Ladybug	Family Coccinellidae		1974
Minnesota	Monarch butterfly (state butterfly)	Danaus plexippus		2000
Minnesota	Rusty patched bumblebee (state bee)	Bombus affinis	A closeup of a yellow and black bee head on, against a black backdrop	2019
Mississippi	European honey bee (state insect)	Apis mellifera		1980
Mississippi	Spicebush swallowtail (state butterfly)	Papilio troilus		1991
Missouri	European honey bee	Apis mellifera		1985
Montana	Mourning cloak butterfly (state butterfly)	Nymphalis antiopa		2001
Nebraska	European honey bee	Apis mellifera		1975
Nevada	Vivid dancer damselfly	Argia vivida		2009
New Hampshire	ladybug (state insect)	Coccinellidae		1977
New Hampshire	Karner blue butterfly (state butterfly)	Plebejus melissa samuelis		1992
New Jersey	European honey bee (state bug)	Apis mellifera		1974
New Jersey	Black swallowtail (state butterfly)	Papilio polyxenes		2014
New Mexico	Tarantula hawk wasp (state insect)	Pepsis grossa		1989
New Mexico	Sandia hairstreak (state butterfly)	Callophrys mcfarlandi		2003
New York	9-spotted ladybug	Coccinella novemnotata		1989
North Carolina	European honey bee (state insect)	Apis mellifera		1973
North Carolina	Eastern tiger swallowtail (state butterfly)	Papilio glaucus		2012
North Dakota	Convergent lady beetle	Hippodamia convergens		2011
Ohio	Ladybug	Family Coccinellidae		1975
Oklahoma	European honey bee (state insect)	Apis mellifera		1992
Oklahoma	Black swallowtail (state butterfly)	Papilio polyxenes		1996
Oregon	Oregon swallowtail	Papilio oregonius		1979
Pennsylvania	Pennsylvania firefly	Photuris pennsylvanica		1974
Rhode Island	American burying beetle	Nicrophorus americanus		2015
South Carolina	Carolina mantis (state insect)	Stagmomantis carolina		1988
South Carolina	Eastern tiger swallowtail (state butterfly)	Papilio glaucus		1994
South Dakota	European honey bee	Apis mellifera		1978
Tennessee	Common eastern firefly (state insect)	Photinus pyralis		1975
Tennessee	ladybug (state insect)	Coccinellidae		1975
Tennessee	European honey bee (state agricultural insect)	Apis mellifera		1990
Tennessee	Zebra swallowtail (state butterfly)	Eurytides marcellus		1995
Texas	Monarch butterfly	Danaus plexippus		1995
Utah	European honey bee	Apis mellifera		1983
Vermont	European honey bee (state insect)	Apis mellifera		1978
Vermont	Monarch butterfly (state butterfly)	Danaus plexippus		1987
Virginia	Eastern tiger swallowtail (state insect)	Papilio glaucus		1991
Virginia	European honey bee (state pollinator)	Apis mellifera		2024
Washington	Green darner dragonfly	Anax junius		1997
West Virginia	European honey bee (state insect)	Apis mellifera		2002
West Virginia	Monarch butterfly (state butterfly)	Danaus plexippus		1995
Wisconsin	European honey bee	Apis mellifera		1977
Wyoming	Sheridan's green hairstreak	Callophrys sheridanii		2009

== See also ==
- Lists of United States state insignia
