= List of U.S. state and territory flowers =

This is a list of U.S. state, federal district, and territory flowers.

State federal district or territory	Common name	Scientific name	Image	Year
Alabama	Camellia (state flower)	Camellia japonica		1959 (clarified 1999)
Alabama	Oak-leaf hydrangea (state wildflower)	Hydrangea quercifolia		1999
Alaska	Forget-me-not	Myosotis asiatica		1917
American Samoa	Paogo (Ulafala)	Pandanus tectorius		1973
Arizona	Saguaro cactus blossom	Carnegiea gigantea		1931
Arkansas	Apple blossom	Malus		1901
California	California poppy	Eschscholzia californica		1903
Colorado	Colorado blue columbine	Aquilegia coerulea		1899
Connecticut	Mountain laurel (state flower)	Kalmia latifolia		1907
Connecticut	Michaela Petit's Four-O’Clocks (children's state flower)	Mirabilis jalapa		2015
Delaware	Peach blossom	Prunus persica		1953
District of Columbia	American Beauty Rose	Rosa		1925
Florida	Orange blossom (state flower)	Citrus sinensis	Orange blossom	1909
Florida	Tickseed (state wildflower)	Coreopsis spp.	Coreopsis gladiata	1991
Georgia	Cherokee rose (state floral emblem)	Rosa laevigata		1916
Georgia	Azalea (state wildflower)	Rhododendron		1979
Guam	Bougainvillea spectabilis	Bougainvillea spectabilis		1968
Hawaii	Hawaiian hibiscus (maʻo hau hele)	Hibiscus brackenridgei		1988
Idaho	Syringa, mock orange	Philadelphus lewisii		1931
Illinois	Violet (state flower)	Viola		1907
Illinois	Milkweed (state wildflower)	Asclepias spp.		2017
Indiana	Peony	Paeonia		1957
Iowa	Wild rose	Rosa arkansana		1897
Kansas	Sunflower	Helianthus annuus		1903
Kentucky	Goldenrod	Solidago gigantea		1926
Louisiana	Magnolia (state flower)	Magnolia		1900
Louisiana	Louisiana iris (state wildflower)	Iris giganticaerulea		1990
Maine	White pine cone and tassel	Pinus strobus		1895
Maryland	Black-eyed susan	Rudbeckia hirta		1918
Massachusetts	Mayflower	Epigaea repens		1918
Michigan	Apple blossom (state flower)	Malus		1897
Michigan	Dwarf lake iris (state wildflower)	Iris lacustris		1998
Minnesota	Pink and white lady's slipper	Cypripedium reginae		1902 (enacted 1967)
Mississippi	Magnolia (state flower)	Magnolia		1900 (enacted 1952)
Mississippi	Tickseed (state wildflower)	Coreopsis		1991
Missouri	Hawthorn	Crataegus		1923
Montana	Bitterroot	Lewisia rediviva		1894
Nebraska	Goldenrod	Solidago gigantea		1895
Nevada	Sagebrush	Artemisia tridentata		1967
New Hampshire	Purple lilac (state flower)	Syringa vulgaris		1919
New Hampshire	Pink lady's slipper (state wildflower)	Cypripedium acaule		1991
New Jersey	Violet	Viola sororia		1971
New Mexico	Yucca flower	Yucca		1927
New York	Rose	Rosa		1955
North Carolina	Flowering dogwood (state flower)	Cornus florida		1941
North Carolina	Carolina lily (state wildflower)	Lilium michauxii		2003
North Dakota	Wild prairie rose	Rosa blanda or arkansana		1907
Northern Mariana Islands	Flores mayo	Plumeria		1979
Ohio	Scarlet carnation (state flower)	Dianthus caryophyllus		1953
Ohio	Large white trillium (state wild flower)	Trillium grandiflorum		1987
Oklahoma	Oklahoma rose (state flower)	Rosa		2004
Oklahoma	Indian blanket (state wildflower)	Gaillardia pulchella		1986
Oklahoma	Mistletoe (state floral emblem)	Phoradendron leucarpum		1893
Oregon	Oregon grape	Berberis aquifolium		1899
Pennsylvania	Mountain laurel (state flower)	Kalmia latifolia		1933
Pennsylvania	Penngift crown vetch (beautification and conservation plant)	Coronilla varia		1982
Puerto Rico	Flor de Maga	Thespesia grandiflora		2019
Rhode Island	Violet	Viola		1968
South Carolina	Yellow jessamine (state flower)	Gelsemium sempervirens		1924
South Carolina	Goldenrod (state wildflower)	Solidago altissima		2003
South Dakota	Pasque flower	Pulsatilla hirsutissima		1903
Tennessee	Iris (state cultivated flower)	Iris		1933
Tennessee	Purple passionflower (state wildflower 1)	Passiflora incarnata		1919
Tennessee	Tennessee purple coneflower (state wildflower 2)	Echinacea tennesseensis		2012
Texas	Bluebonnet spp.	Lupinus spp.		1901 (broadened in 1971)
Utah	Sego lily	Calochortus nuttallii		1911
Vermont	Red clover	Trifolium pratense		1894
Virgin Islands	Yellow Elder	Tecoma stans		1934
Virginia	American dogwood	Cornus florida		1918
Washington	Coast rhododendron	Rhododendron macrophyllum		1892 (officially 1959)
West Virginia	Rhododendron	Rhododendron maximum		1903
Wisconsin	Wood violet	Viola papilionacea	Wood Violet	1909
Wyoming	Indian paintbrush	Castilleja linariifolia		1917

== See also ==
- List of U.S. state trees
- Lists of U.S. state insignia
- Lists of United States state symbols
