= List of U.S. state and territory trees =

This is a list of U.S. state, federal district, and territory trees, including official trees of the following of the states, of the federal district, and of the territories.

State federal district or territory	Common name	Scientific name	Image	Year
Alabama	Longleaf pine	Pinus palustris		1949 clarified 1997
Alaska	Sitka spruce	Picea sitchensis		1962
American Samoa	None			
Arizona	Blue palo verde	Parkinsonia florida		1954
Arkansas	Loblolly pine	Pinus taeda		1939
California	Coast redwood	Sequoia sempervirens		1937
California	Giant sequoia	Sequoiadendron giganteum		1937
Colorado	Colorado blue spruce	Picea pungens		1939
Connecticut	White oak (See also: Charter Oak)	Quercus alba		1947
Delaware	American holly	Ilex opaca		1939
District of Columbia	Scarlet oak	Quercus coccinea		1960
Florida	Sabal palm	Sabal palmetto		1953
Georgia	Southern live oak	Quercus virginiana		1937
Guam	Ifit (Pacific teak)	Intsia bijuga		1969
Hawaii	Candlenut tree (kukui)	Aleurites moluccanus		1959
Idaho	Western white pine	Pinus monticola		1935
Illinois	White oak	Quercus alba		1973
Indiana	Tulip tree	Liriodendron tulipifera		1931
Iowa	Oak (variety unspecified)	Quercus spp.		1961
Kansas	Eastern cottonwood	Populus deltoides		1937
Kentucky	Tulip poplar	Liriodendron tulipifera		1994
Louisiana	Bald cypress (Note: Louisiana also has the mayhaw as its state fruit tree.)	Taxodium distichum		1963
Maine	Eastern white pine	Pinus strobus		1945
Maryland	White oak (See also: Wye Oak)	Quercus alba		1941
Massachusetts	American elm	Ulmus americana		1941
Michigan	Eastern white pine	Pinus strobus		1955
Minnesota	Red pine (aka Norway pine)	Pinus resinosa		1953
Mississippi	Southern magnolia	Magnolia grandiflora		1952
Missouri	Flowering dogwood	Cornus florida		1955
Montana	Ponderosa pine	Pinus ponderosa		1949
Nebraska	Eastern cottonwood	Populus deltoides		1972
Nevada	Single-leaf pinyon	Pinus monophylla		1959
Nevada	Great Basin bristlecone pine	Pinus longaeva		1987
New Hampshire	American white birch	Betula papyrifera		1947
New Jersey	Northern red oak	Quercus rubra		1950
New Mexico	Piñon pine	Pinus edulis		1949
New York	Sugar maple	Acer saccharum		1956
North Carolina	Pine	Pinus		1963
North Dakota	American elm	Ulmus americana		1947
Northern Mariana Islands	Flame tree	Delonix regia		1979
Ohio	Ohio buckeye	Aesculus glabra		1953
Oklahoma	Eastern redbud	Cercis canadensis		1971
Oregon	Douglas fir	Pseudotsuga menziesii		1939
Pennsylvania	Eastern hemlock	Tsuga canadensis		1931
Puerto Rico	Ceiba (unofficial (Note: The Institute of Puerto Rican Culture proposed the ceiba as the official tree. It was not officially adopted, but it remains a popular symbol of the Commonwealth.))	Ceiba pentandra		
Rhode Island	Red maple	Acer rubrum		1964
South Carolina	Sabal palm	Sabal palmetto		1939
South Dakota	Black Hills spruce	Picea glauca var. densata		1947
Tennessee	Tulip-tree	Liriodendron tulipifera		1947
Texas	Pecan	Carya illinoinensis		1919
United States Virgin Islands	None			
Utah	Quaking aspen	Populus tremuloides		2014
Vermont	Sugar maple	Acer saccharum		1949
Virginia	Flowering dogwood	Cornus florida		1956
Washington	Western hemlock	Tsuga heterophylla		1947
West Virginia	Sugar maple	Acer saccharum		1949
Wisconsin	Sugar maple	Acer saccharum		1949
Wyoming	Plains cottonwood	Populus deltoides monilifera		1947, amended 1961

== See also ==
- List of U.S. state, district, and territorial insignia
- National Grove of State Trees
- National Register of Champion Trees
