= List of New Mexico state symbols =

List of the officially designated state symbols of the U.S. state of New Mexico

Location of the state of New Mexico in the United States

This is a list of the officially designated state symbols of the U.S. state of New Mexico. Most such designations are found in Chapter 12, Article 3 of the New Mexico Statutes Annotated. The majority of the items in the list are officially recognized after a law is passed by the state legislature. New Mexico is the first state to adopt a state question: "Red or green?," referring to chile peppers. The state also has a prescribed answer: "Red and green or Christmas," encouraging the use of both colors of chile.

== Insignia ==
Type	Symbol	Description	Adopted	Image	Ref.
Motto	Crescit eundo	"It grows as it goes."	1887	—N/a	
Seal	Great Seal of the State of New Mexico	The coat of arms of the state shall be the Mexican eagle grasping a serpent in its beak, the cactus in its talons, shielded by the American eagle with outspread wings, and grasping arrows in its talons; the date 1912 under the eagles and, on a scroll, the motto: "Crescit Eundo". The great seal of the state shall be a disc bearing the coat of arms and having around the edge the words "Great Seal of the State of New Mexico." — Section 12-3-1 NMSA 1978	1913	Great Seal of the State of New Mexico	
Flag	Flag of New Mexico	That a flag be and the same is hereby adopted to be used on all occasions when the state is officially and publicly represented, with the privilege of use by all citizens upon such occasions as they may deem fitting and appropriate. Said flag shall be the ancient Zia sun symbol of red in the center of a field of yellow. The colors shall be the red and yellow of old Spain. The proportion of the flag shall be a width of two-thirds its length. The sun symbol shall be one-third of the length of the flag. Said symbol shall have four groups of rays set at right angles; each group shall consist of four rays, the two inner rays of the group shall be one-fifth longer than the outer rays of the group. The diameter of the circle in the center of the symbol shall be one-third of the width of the symbol. Said flag shall conform in color and design described herein. — Section 12-3-2 NMSA 1978	1925	New Mexico flag	
Salute (English)	Salute to state flag	"I salute the flag of the state of New Mexico, the Zia symbol of perfect friendship among united cultures."	1963	—N/a	
Salute (Spanish)	Spanish language salute to state flag	"Saludo la bandera del estado de Nuevo Mejico, el simbolo zia de amistad perfecta, entre culturas unidas."	1963	—N/a	

== Flora ==
Type	Symbol	Adopted	Image	Ref.
Flower	Yucca flower	1927		(Note: The yucca flower is adopted as the official flower of New Mexico. — Section 12-3-4 NMSA 1978 Although no specific species of yucca is given in the statute, the 2015 New Mexico Blue Book references the soaptree yucca (Yucca elata) as one of the more widespread species in New Mexico.)
Tree	The nut pine or pinon tree (Pinus edulis)	1949		
Grass	Blue grama (Bouteloua gracilis)	1973		

== Fauna ==
Type	Symbol	Adopted	Image	Ref.
Bird	Greater roadrunner (Geococcyx californianus)	1949		(Note: The chaparral bird, commonly called roadrunner, is adopted as the official bird of New Mexico. — Section 12-3-4 NMSA 1978 The species name is not given, but the greater roadrunner (Geococcyx californianus) is native to New Mexico and is also referred to as the chaparral cock.)
Fish	Rio Grande cutthroat trout (Oncorhynchus clarkii virginalis)	1955		(Note: The native New Mexico cutthroat trout is adopted as the official fish of New Mexico. — Section 12-3-4 NMSA 1978 The state statute lists "the native New Mexico cutthroat trout". However, it is generally accepted that the Rio Grande cutthroat (Oncorhynchus clarkii virginalis) is the intended fish.)
Animal	New Mexico Black Bear (Ursus americanus amblyceps)	1963		
Insect	Tarantula hawk wasp (Pepsis formosa)	1989		
Amphibian	New Mexico spadefoot toad (Spea multiplicata)	2003		
Butterfly	Sandia hairstreak (Callophrys mcfarlandi)	2003		
Reptile	New Mexico whiptail lizard (Cnemidophorus neomexicanus)	2003		

== Geology ==
Type	Symbol	Adopted	Image	Ref.
Gem	Turquoise	1967		
Fossil	Coelophysis (Coelophysis bauri)	1981		

== Food and Related ==
Type	Symbol	Adopted	Image	Ref.
Vegetable	New Mexico chile	1965		(Note: The chile, the Spanish adaptation of the chilli, and the pinto bean, commonly known as the frijol, are adopted as the official vegetables of New Mexico. — Section 12-3-4 NMSA 1978 Chile peppers grow on five species of Capsicum. Community sentiment has it that the New Mexico chile (Capsicum annuum 'New Mexico Group') is the official chile, including having this chile appear on one of New Mexico's alternative license plates beginning in 2017.)
Vegetable	Pinto bean	1965		
Cookie	Bizcochito	1989		
Question	"Red or green?"	2003		
Answer	"Red and green or Christmas"	2007		
Aroma	"The aroma of green chile roasting"	2023		

== Music and Poetry ==
Type	Title	Author	Adopted	Ref.
State Song	O Fair New Mexico	Elizabeth Garrett	1917	
Spanish Language State Song	Así Es Nuevo México	Amadeo Lucero	1971	
Ballad	Land Of Enchantment	Michael Martin Murphey	1989	
Poem	A Nuevo México	Luis Tafoya	1991	
Bilingual Song	New Mexico - Mi Lindo Nuevo México	Pablo Mares	1995	
Cowboy Song	Under the New Mexico Skies	Syd Masters	2009	

== Other ==
Type	Symbol	Adopted	Image	Ref.
Slogan	"Everybody is somebody in New Mexico."	1975		
Balloon Museum	Anderson Abruzzo Albuquerque International Balloon Museum	1999		
Nickname	"The Land of Enchantment"	2003		
Aircraft	Hot air balloon	2005		
Historic Railroad	Cumbres and Toltec Scenic Railroad	2005		
Tie	Bolo tie	2007		
Guitar	New Mexico sunrise guitar	2009		
Necklace	Native American squash blossom necklace	2011		
Steam Locomotive	Atchison, Topeka and Santa Fe 2926	2016		

== National Statuary Hall Collection ==
Subject	Artist	Medium	Year	Location	Image	Ref.
Dennis Chavez	Felix W. de Weldon	Bronze	1966	Senate Wing, 2nd Floor; U.S. Capitol Building		
Po'pay	Cliff Fragua	Marble	2005	U.S. Capitol Visitor Center		

== Navy Vessels ==
Name	Description	Commissioned	Image	Ref.
USS New Mexico (BB-40)	New Mexico-class battleship	1918 - 1946		
USS New Mexico (SSN-779)	Virginia-class submarine	2010		
