= Tennessee marble =

Type of crystalline limestone

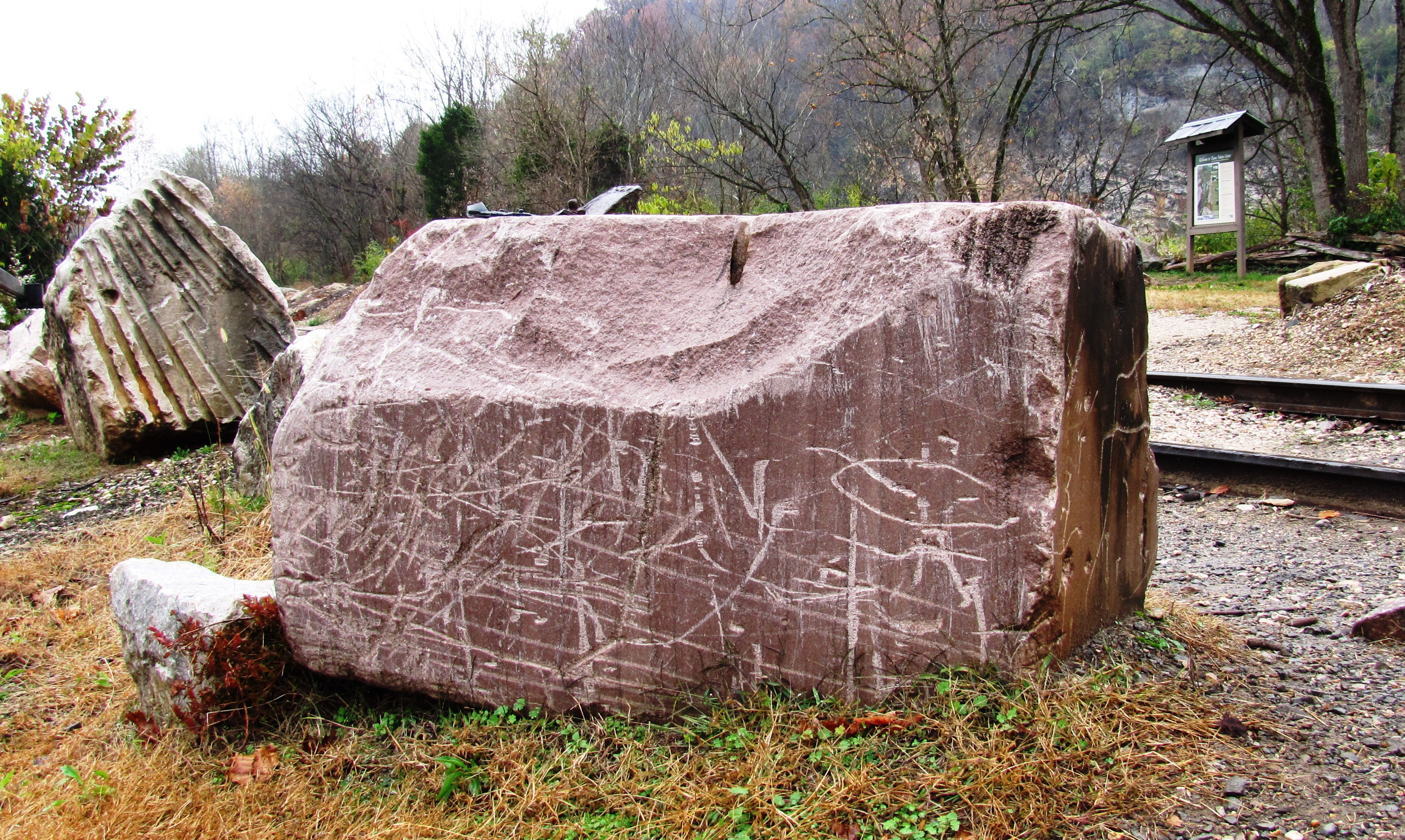
Quarried block of pink Tennessee marble

Tennessee marble is a type of crystalline limestone found only in East Tennessee, in the southeastern United States. Long esteemed by architects and builders for its pinkish-gray color and the ease with which it is polished, the stone has been used in the construction of numerous notable buildings and monuments throughout the United States and Canada, including the National Gallery of Art, National Air and Space Museum, and United States Capitol in Washington, D.C., the Minnesota State Capitol, Grand Central Terminal in New York, and Union Station in Toronto. Tennessee marble achieved such popularity in the late-19th century that Knoxville, the stone's primary finishing and distribution center, became known as "The Marble City."

While Tennessee marble is not true marble, its crystalline nature lends it a strong resemblance to marble, especially when polished. The stone occurs in belts of Ordovician-period rocks known as the Holston Formation and is quarried primarily in Knox, Blount, Loudon, Union, and Hawkins counties. While pink is the most well-known color, the stone also occurs in gray, dark brown ("cedar"), and variegated shades.

The use of Tennessee marble declined after World War II, when cheaper building materials became widely available. There are currently only six active quarries, all operated by the Tennessee Marble Company. The stone has most recently been used in the floor of the United States Capitol Visitor Center and for the 170-ton "First Amendment" tablet that initially adorned the facade of Washington's Newseum, as well as the National Constitution Center in Philadelphia, Pennsylvania.

== Geology ==
=== Occurrence ===
Tennessee marble is found in the Appalachian Ridge-and-Valley Province, a series of alternating elongate ridges and valleys that lie between the Blue Ridge Mountains and the Cumberland Plateau. The Holston Formation, in which Tennessee marble is found, occurs in a series of belts that follow the natural folds and faults of the ridges and valleys. While these belts can be up to 75 miles (121 km) long, they are rarely more than a few miles wide. In 1911, the Tennessee State Geological Survey identified six primary Holston Formation belts containing Tennessee marble: the Luttrell, Black Oak, Concord, Knoxville, Bays Mountain, and French Broad belts. A seventh belt, the Galbraith in Hawkins County, is considered an extension of the Black Oak.

The Luttrell belt, the westernmost of the Holston Formation belts, stretches along Copper Ridge from Beaver Creek in Fountain City northeast to Galbraith Springs (about 10 miles (16 km) west of Rogersville) in Hawkins County. The Black Oak belt stretches along Black Oak Ridge from Monroe County to the Corryton area in north Knox County. The Concord belt, one of the most heavily quarried, stretches from Sweetwater through Knox County to Strawberry Plains. The Knoxville belt, also heavily quarried, stretches from southeast of Sweetwater to Ruggles Ferry (east of Knoxville) in Knox. The Bays Mountain belt is found along the southwestern end of Bays Mountain in south Knox County and stretches into northern Blount County. The French Broad belt is a u-shaped belt found at the confluence of the French Broad and Holston rivers ("Forks-of-the-River").

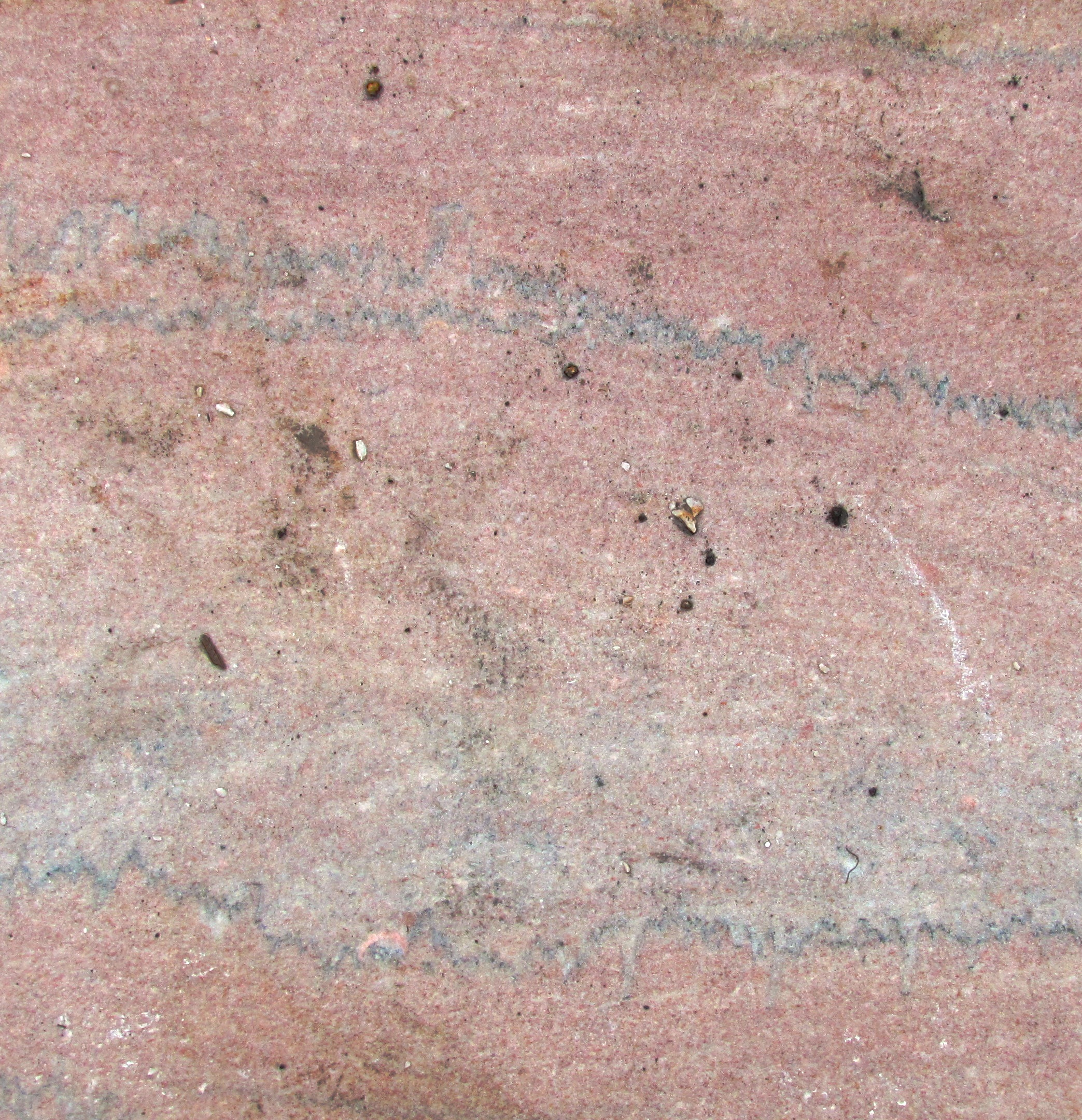
Polished pink Tennessee marble surface

=== Lithology ===
While true marble is metamorphic, Tennessee marble is sedimentary and is therefore classified as limestone. Tennessee marble was formed from the accumulation of bryozoan and other primordial marine lifeforms 460 million years ago, during the Ordovician period. Even when polished, the stone retains a fossiliferous texture, with bryozoan and crinoid fossils being among the most commonly found. A noticeable feature is the presence of jagged horizontal gray or black lines, or "stylolites." Known as "crowfeet" by quarrymen, these form from residual insoluble materials left over from the natural limestone dissolution processes.

The most well-known shades are pink, gray, and cedar, but it also is found in blue, yellow, and cream shades. Along with its aesthetic colors, builders preferred the stone for its durability, the ease with which it is polished, and the fact that the stone is virtually impervious to stains. Tennessee marble is also easily converted into lime, and mid-20th century lime companies occasionally erected kilns near defunct quarries for this purpose.

== History ==
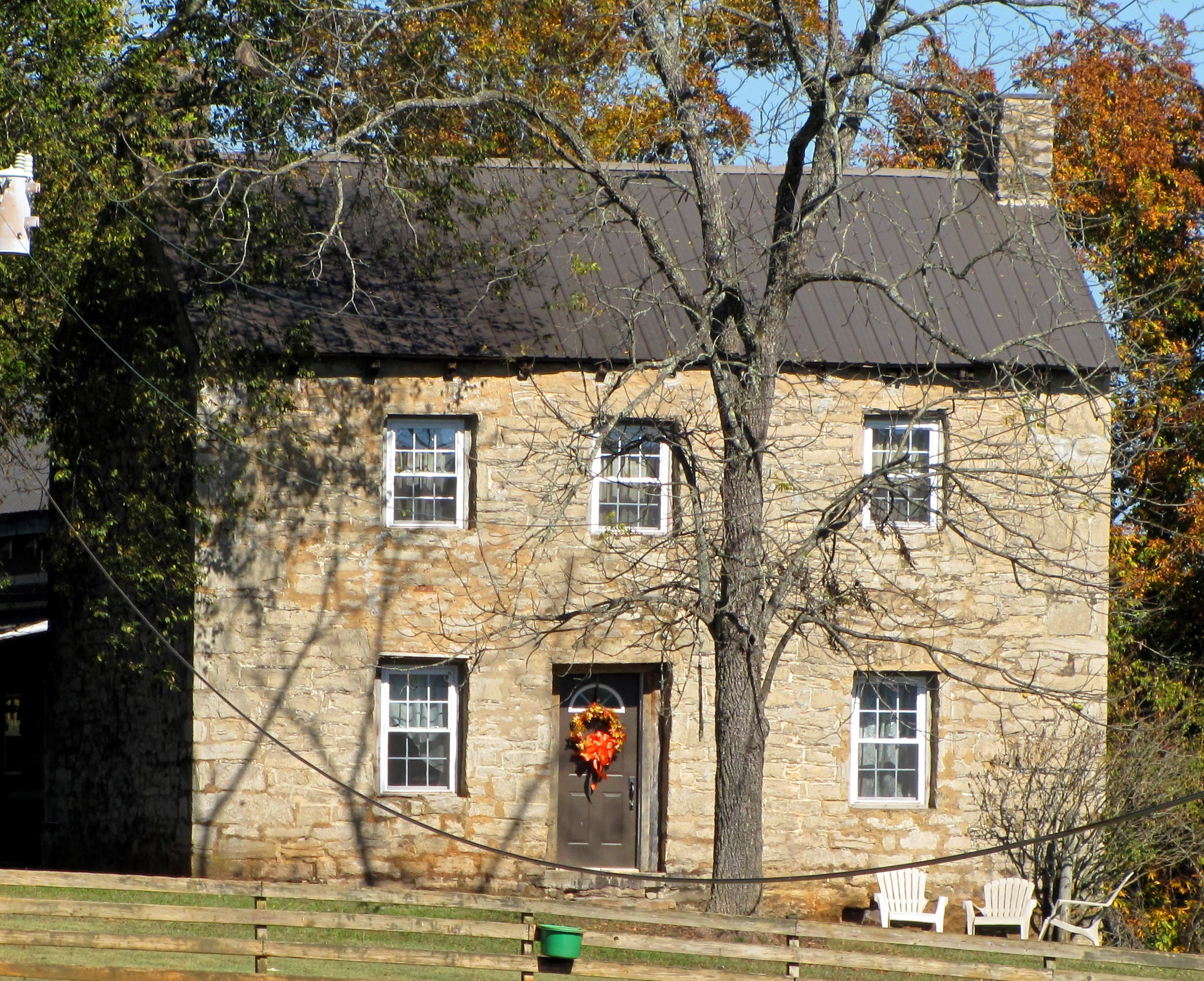
The 18th-century "Old Stone House" near Friendsville, Tennessee, built of brown Tennessee marble

As early as the late 18th century, Tennessee marble was being harvested for construction purposes, most notably for the Ramsey House on the outskirts of Knoxville and the "Old Stone House" near modern Friendsville. Visitors to East Tennessee were reporting the existence of marble beds in the region as early as the 1810s, and state geologist Gerard Troost provided an extensive description of Tennessee marble deposits in an 1831 report to the Tennessee General Assembly. The Rogersville Marble Company, founded in 1838, produced monuments and furniture stone extracted from a quarry in Hawkins County. Marble Hall, a house built by the company's director, Orville Rice, contained numerous Tennessee marble interior elements and acted as a showplace for the company.

In 1850, Tennessee Governor William Trousdale chose the Rogersville Marble Company's marble as the state's representative stone for the construction of the Washington Monument. During this same period, marble from Hawkins County, either from Rice's quarry or a rival quarry south of Rogersville, was used in U.S. Capitol extension projects (William Dougherty, the construction superintendent for the Washington Monument, was instrumental in obtaining the marble). Transporting the quarried blocks out of the region presented a major challenge for these early companies. Mule teams, often led by local African American entrepreneurs, carried the blocks to the Holston River, where they were loaded onto flatboats and transported downstream.

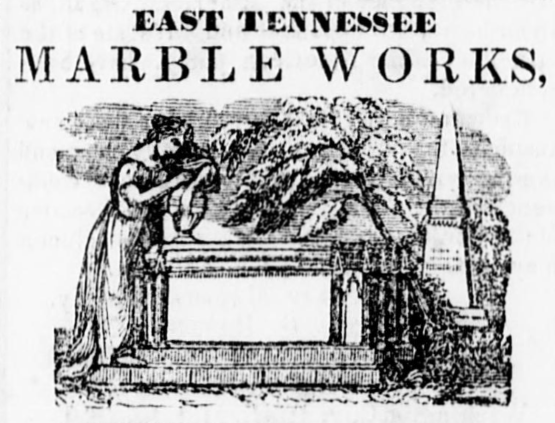
1856 newspaper ad for a Knoxville-based Tennessee marble company

By the early 1850s, at least two marble quarries were in operation in Knox County, one of which supplied marble for the Tennessee State Capitol. The arrival of railroads in the region, namely the predecessor lines of the East Tennessee, Virginia and Georgia Railway, provided a major boost for the industry and helped Knox County overtake Hawkins as the region's primary quarrying and production center. The industry was also aided by an infusion of northern capital in the years following the Civil War.

In 1873, federal architect Alfred B. Mullett used Tennessee marble for Knoxville's Post Office and Customs House, sparking a nationwide curiosity in the stone. Mullett acquired the marble from a quarry at Forks-of-the-River. After the building's completion, businessman George Ross and several associates organized the Knoxville Marble Company to assume control of this quarry and provided marble for the construction of the Mullett-designed Customs House in St. Louis in the 1870s.

By 1882, 11 quarries were in operation in Knox County. This number had doubled within a decade, as the rising popularity of Neoclassical architecture brought about a rapid increase in demand for marble. Knoxville, the industry's chief financial and production center, became known as "The Marble City" during this period and even included a marble mining derrick on the Knoxville flag. The community of Concord, located west of Knoxville, became a key marble transloading center, where blocks were transferred from boats to rail cars for transport out of the region. By 1885, Concord was home to ten marble-related companies.

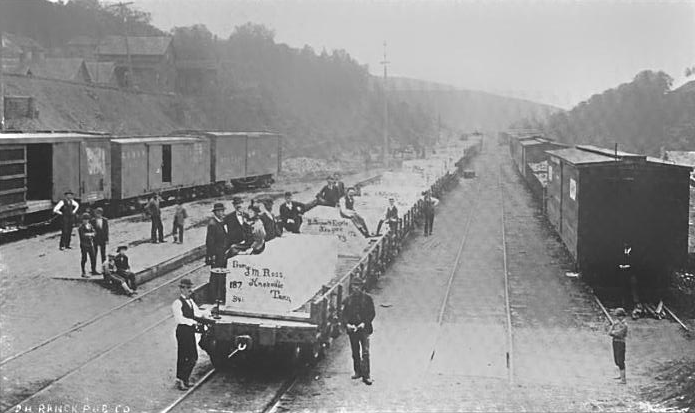
Marble blocks being loaded onto train cars at what is now Mead's Quarry in 1895

The Ross Quarry supplied marble for the J.P. Morgan Library in New York in the 1900s. The Candoro Marble Works, a large finishing mill, was founded in South Knoxville in 1914.

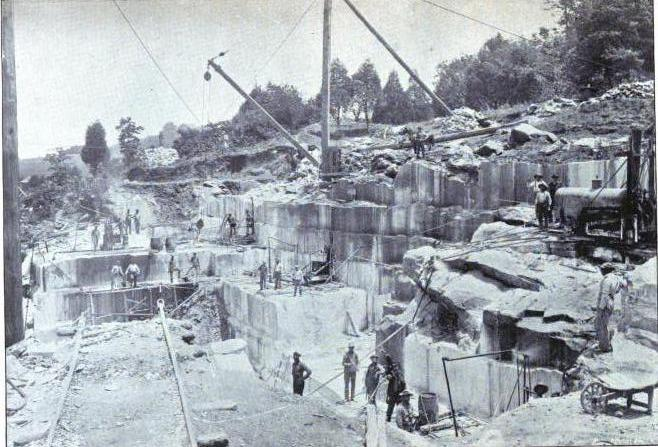
Marble quarry near Knoxville, circa 1911

By 1908, Tennessee ranked third in the nation in marble production, behind Vermont and Georgia. While 80% of marble quarried in the state was used in furniture and interior decoration, it was best known as a monumental building material. Monuments and buildings constructed of Tennessee marble during the early 20th century include the St. Paul Public Library in Minnesota, the Richard C. Lee U.S. Courthouse in New Haven, Connecticut, and the Firemen's Memorial in Manhattan.

The rise of modern architecture and the short-term cost savings of using concrete, coupled with the onset of the Great Depression, led to a decline in the Tennessee marble industry by the end of the 1920s. The stone experienced a brief resurgence in the 1930s as New Deal federal construction projects encouraged the use of locally quarried building materials. Buildings completed during this period include the National Gallery of Art (West Building), the Knoxville Post Office, and the Tennessee Supreme Court Building in Nashville.

By the 1950s, only five Tennessee marble companies remained in operation. Some companies had turned to secondary products such as lime, which was often produced in kilns located near the quarries. The rise in foreign competition and changes in demand for building materials led to further decline, and most Tennessee marble companies had closed by the 1980s. The stone was still produced on a smaller scale, however. It was used in the Edward Larrabee Barnes-designed Knoxville Museum of Art, completed in 1990, and the BarberMcMurry-designed Gay Street addition of Knoxville's East Tennessee History Center, completed in 2005. The Tennessee Marble Company, founded in 1993, is currently the only major producer of Tennessee marble. The company was operating six quarries as of 2007.

== Notable producers ==
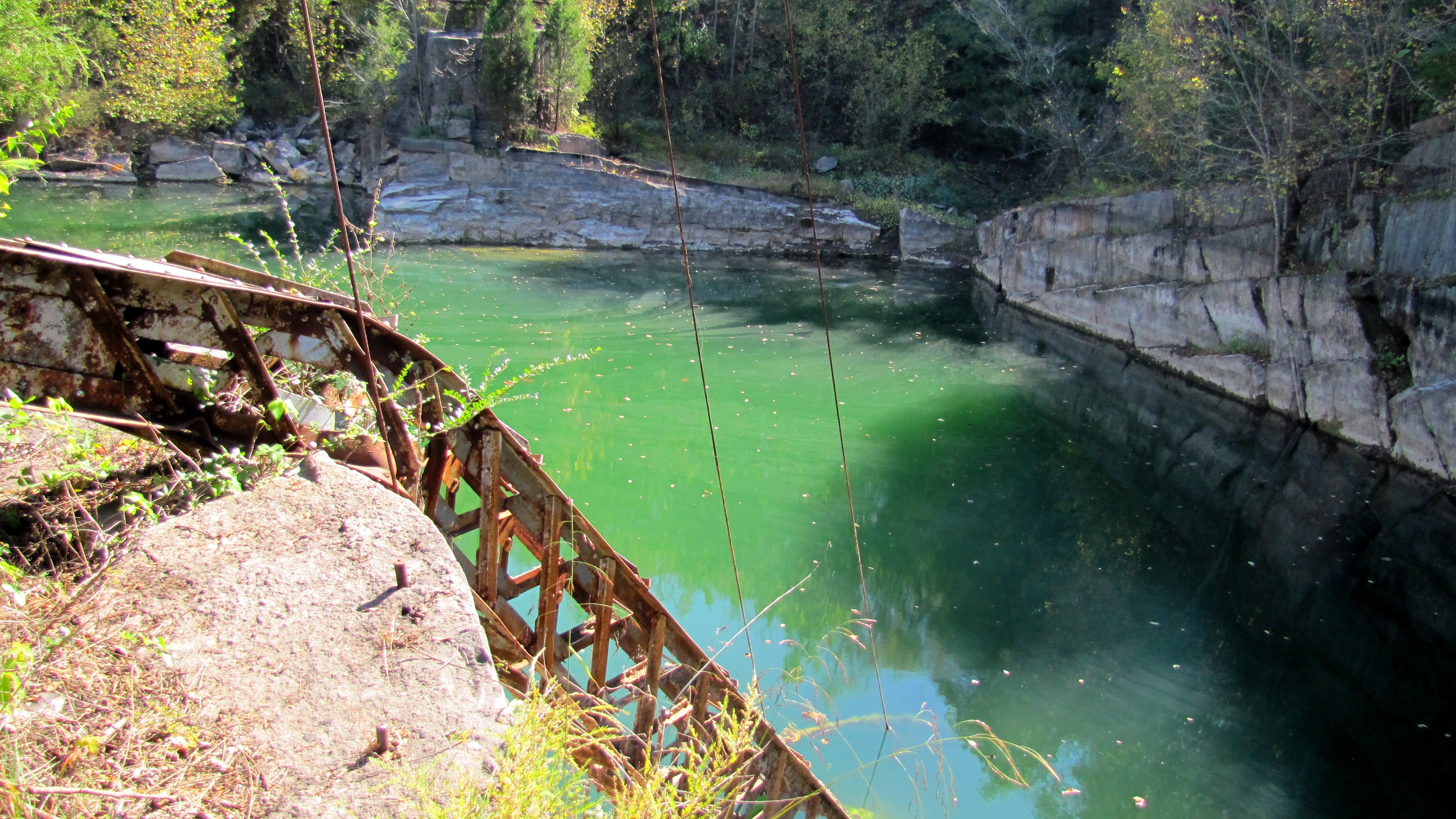
Abandoned quarry near Friendsville

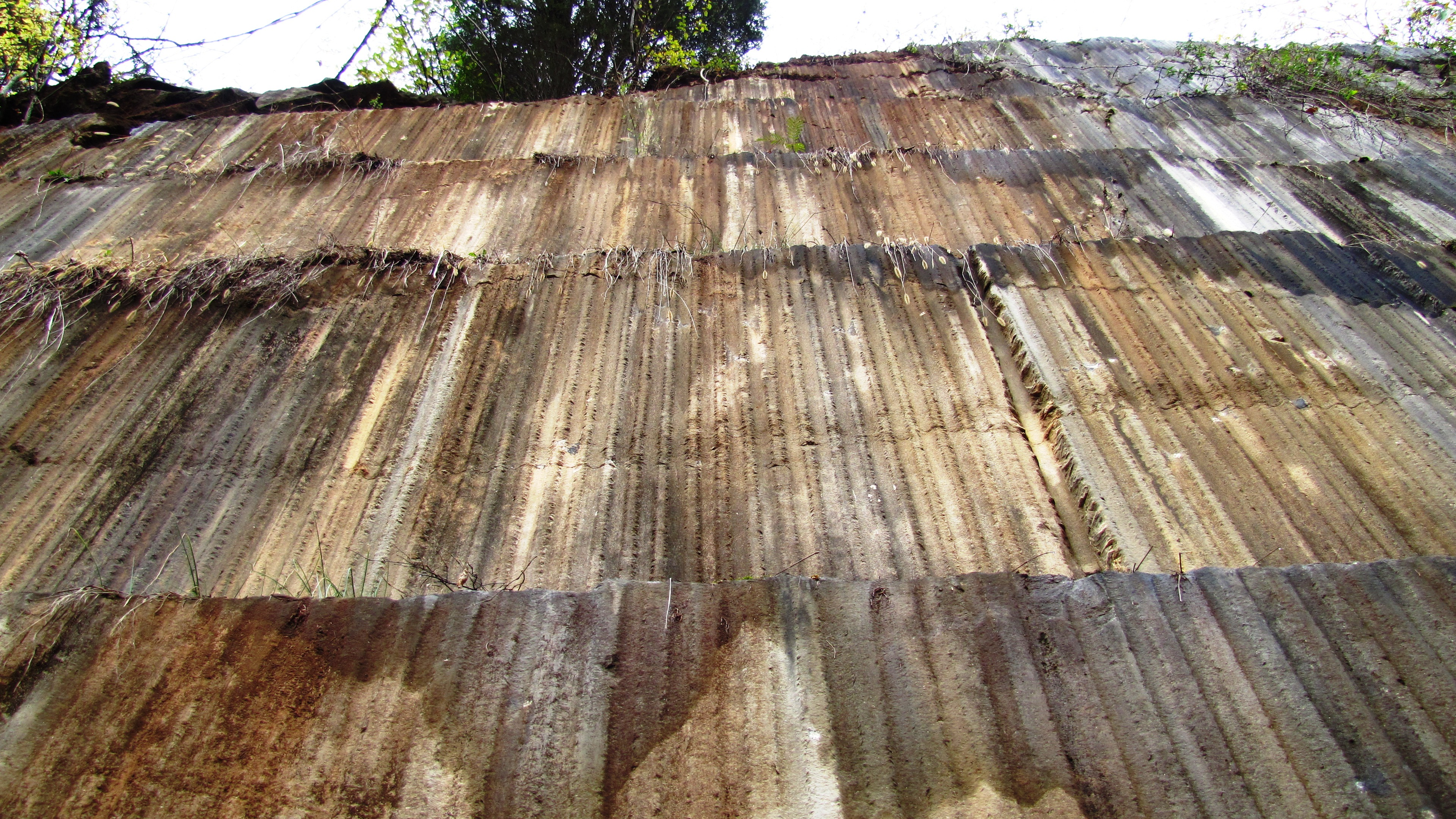
Walls of the Ross Marble Quarry in South Knoxville (now part of the Ijams Nature Center)

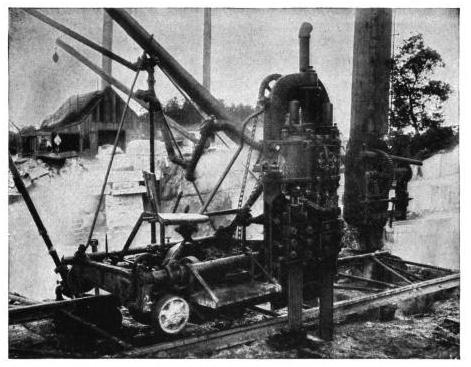
Sullivan channeler used to cut stone blocks

- Rogersville Marble Company, the first Tennessee marble company, founded in 1838 under the directorship of S.D. Mitchell and Orville Rice. The company obtained its marble from a quarry in Hawkins County (possibly located along Caney Creek west of Rogersville), and offered interior furnishings such as floors, doors and mantelpieces. By 1850, Rice was operating a "marble factory" near Rogersville that used water-powered machinery to produce monuments and tombstones.
- Knoxville Marble Company, founded in 1873 to assume control of the quarry near Forks-of-the-River in east Knox County where the marble for the Knoxville Customs House had been obtained; William Patrick was the first president, George W. Ross was secretary-treasurer. Ross's son, John M. Ross, became president of the company in January 1886. The company eventually sold its Forks quarry to the W.H. Evans Company.
- John J. Craig Company, founded by John J. Craig (1820–1892) in 1878, reorganized as the Great Southern Marble Company in 1884, and joined with Evans to form the Tennessee Producers Marble Company in 1889. In 1896, the company left the Tennessee Producers partnership, and once again operated as the John J. Craig Company. Craig's son, John J. Craig, Jr. (1860–1904), and grandson, John J. Craig III (1885–1944), would eventually serve as presidents of the company. John J. Craig III and several business partners established the Candoro Marble Works in South Knoxville in 1914. The company operated quarries near Friendsville and Concord, and was the foremost producer of pink Tennessee marble in the early 20th century. The Friendsville quarry and the Candoro Marble Works have been listed on the National Register of Historic Places.
- Ross-Republic Marble Company, established in the late 1890s by the merger of the Republic Marble Company and the interests of Knoxville Marble president John M. Ross. After the sale of the Forks-of-the-River quarry to Evans, Ross established a quarrying operation (now known as the Mead Quarry) across the river in South Knoxville. He sold the quarry to Republic in 1898. Republic, led by president Frank S. Mead, had been operating quarries in the Concord area. John M. Ross subsequently purchased a quarry (now known as the "Ross Quarry") on property adjacent to the Mead Quarry, and would operate as an independent dealer in the early 20th century. Both the Mead and Ross quarries are now managed by Knoxville's Ijams Nature Center and are listed on the National Register of Historic Places.
- W.H. Evans Marble Company, established in Baltimore in 1867, and was overseeing an operation in Hawkins County by 1880; later operated quarries near Friendsville and the former Knoxville Marble quarry at Forks-of-the-River. In 1886, this company built its massive mill near Lonsdale in Knoxville, which by 1911 employed 26 gang saws, nine rubbing beds, and over 100 workers to produce over 40,000 square feet (3,700 m^{2}) of finished marble per year. The company also operated two mills in Baltimore and produced products using both Tennessee and imported marble.
- J.F. Woods and Company, established by Concord quarry operator James Farmer Woods in the late 19th century. Woods was extracting marble from Callaway Ridge near Concord by the 1890s and opened a marble cutting mill around 1900.
- Appalachian Marble Company, established in the late 19th century by Harmon Kreis and Thomas Deane. Kreis, a former Knoxville Marble Company timekeeper, had developed the Gray Knox, American Marble, and Gray Eagle quarries.
- Tennessee Producers Marble Company, founded in 1889 by John J. Craig and W.H. Evans to market their respective quarrying companies' output; while these two companies left the partnership within a few years, this company persisted under the direction of W.B. McMullen and bought its own quarries. In 1911, it was operating the Bond Quarry near Concord, the McMillan Quarry northeast of Knoxville, and the Dunlap Quarry near Friendsville. The company also operated a large mill on University Avenue in downtown Knoxville that employed over twenty-five gang saws to produce over 40,000 square feet (3,700 m^{2}) of finished marble per year.
- Gray Eagle Marble Company, founded in 1902 by former Craig Company employee John Barksdale Jones; supplied "gray, gray-pink, eagle-pink and argent-gray" shades of marble. Jones's descendants continued operating this company into the mid-20th century. Its mill and office complex still stand on Sutherland Avenue in Knoxville (most recently home to Southeast Precast Concrete).
- Tennessee Marble Company, founded in 1993. This company currently operates six quarries and two production factories in East Tennessee. After acquiring the assets of Tennessee Valley Marble in 2007, the Tennessee Marble Company became the primary producer of Tennessee marble.

== Use in art ==
Sculptor Jack Rich described Tennessee marble as an "excellent sculptural stone," though difficult to work with due to its hardness. Two of the best known Tennessee marble sculptures, E.C. Potter's lions, "Patience" and "Fortitude," stand outside the entrance of the New York Public Library Main Branch. The Piccirilli Brothers also worked with the stone, most notably creating the entrance tripods at the Lincoln Memorial in Washington, and several statues at the base of the USS Maine National Monument in New York. The Italian-born sculptor Albert Milani (1892–1977), who worked at the Candoro Marble Works in Knoxville, created numerous works using Tennessee marble, including the four eagles atop the Knoxville Post Office and the "History of the World" relief at the Pennsylvania State Capitol.

Other notable Tennessee marble works include Frances Rich's nurses' memorial ("Spirit of Nursing") at Arlington National Cemetery; Bruno Louis Zimm's Slocum Memorial Fountain in New York's Tompkins Square Park; Joseph Emile Renier's Pomona at Brookgreen Gardens in South Carolina; and Cliff Fragua's statue of the Pueblo leader Po'pay in the National Statuary Hall. One of the best-known paintings by Knoxville artist Lloyd Branson, Hauling Marble, was inspired by the Tennessee marble industry.

== Structures ==
=== Structures with Tennessee marble exteriors ===
Name	City	State	Completed	Other information	Image	Reference
Ramsey House	Knoxville	Tennessee	1797			
Old Customs House	Knoxville	Tennessee	1874			
James Blackstone Memorial Library	Branford	Connecticut	1896			
Morgan Library & Museum (McKim Building)	New York City	New York	1903			
Chilhowee Park bandstand	Knoxville	Tennessee	1910			
Firemen's Memorial	New York City	New York	1913			
St. Paul Public Library	St. Paul	Minnesota	1917			
Illinois Centennial Monument	Chicago	Illinois	1918			
Richard C. Lee U.S. Courthouse	New Haven	Connecticut	1919	Same marble used in main interior staircase, elevator lobbies, and columns in second-floor lobby		
Knoxville Post Office	Knoxville	Tennessee	1934	Various shades of Tennessee marble used throughout the building		
Tennessee Supreme Court Building	Nashville	Tennessee	1937			
National Gallery of Art	Washington	District of Columbia	1941/1978			
Robert A. Taft Memorial	Washington	District of Columbia	1959			
National Air and Space Museum	Washington	District of Columbia	1975			
Knoxville Museum of Art	Knoxville	Tennessee	1990			
East Tennessee History Center addition	Knoxville	Tennessee	2005	Addition to the 1874 Old Customs House		

=== Structures containing Tennessee marble ===
Name	City	State or Country	Completed	Parts containing Tennessee marble	Image	Reference
Mabry-Hazen House	Knoxville	Tennessee	1858	Main Floor Fireplace Mantles		
United States Capitol	Washington	District of Columbia	1850s	Columns and balustrades of House and Senate gallery staircases; Marble Room walls		
Folsom Powerhouse	Folsom	California	1895	Switchboard		
Adriance Memorial Library	Poughkeepsie	New York	1896	Hallway		
Little Rock U.S. Post Office and Courthouse	Little Rock	Arkansas	1897	Courtroom interior		
McKinley National Memorial	Canton	Ohio	1907	Interior walls and pedestal		
Mechanics National Bank Building	Knoxville	Tennessee	1907	Facade		
Grand Central Terminal	New York City	New York	1913	Main concourse floor		
The Holston	Knoxville	Tennessee	1913	Lower Gay Street and Clinch Avenue facades		
Bibliothèque de l'Assemblée nationale du Québec (French)	Quebec City	Quebec	1910-1915	Library floor		
James A. Redden Federal Courthouse	Medford	Oregon	1916	Lobby floor		
Manitoba Legislative Building	Winnipeg	Canada	1920	Rotunda floor		
Union Station	Toronto	Canada	1920	Great Hall floor		
Wilkin County Courthouse	Breckenridge	Minnesota	1929	Interior wainscoting		
Cochise County Courthouse	Bisbee	Arizona	1930	Main lobby		
Eldon B. Mahon U.S. Courthouse	Fort Worth	Texas	1933	Courtroom walls		
Indiana War Memorial Museum	Indianapolis	Indiana	1933	North Vestibule and Grand Foyer floors		
Newseum	Washington	District of Columbia	2008	Massive exterior First Amendment tablet		
United States Capitol Visitor Center	Washington	District of Columbia	2008	First floor		

== See also ==
- List of types of limestone
- List of types of marble
- Sydney sandstone
- Jerusalem stone
