= Candoro Marble Works =

- U.S. National Register of Historic Places
- U.S. Historic district
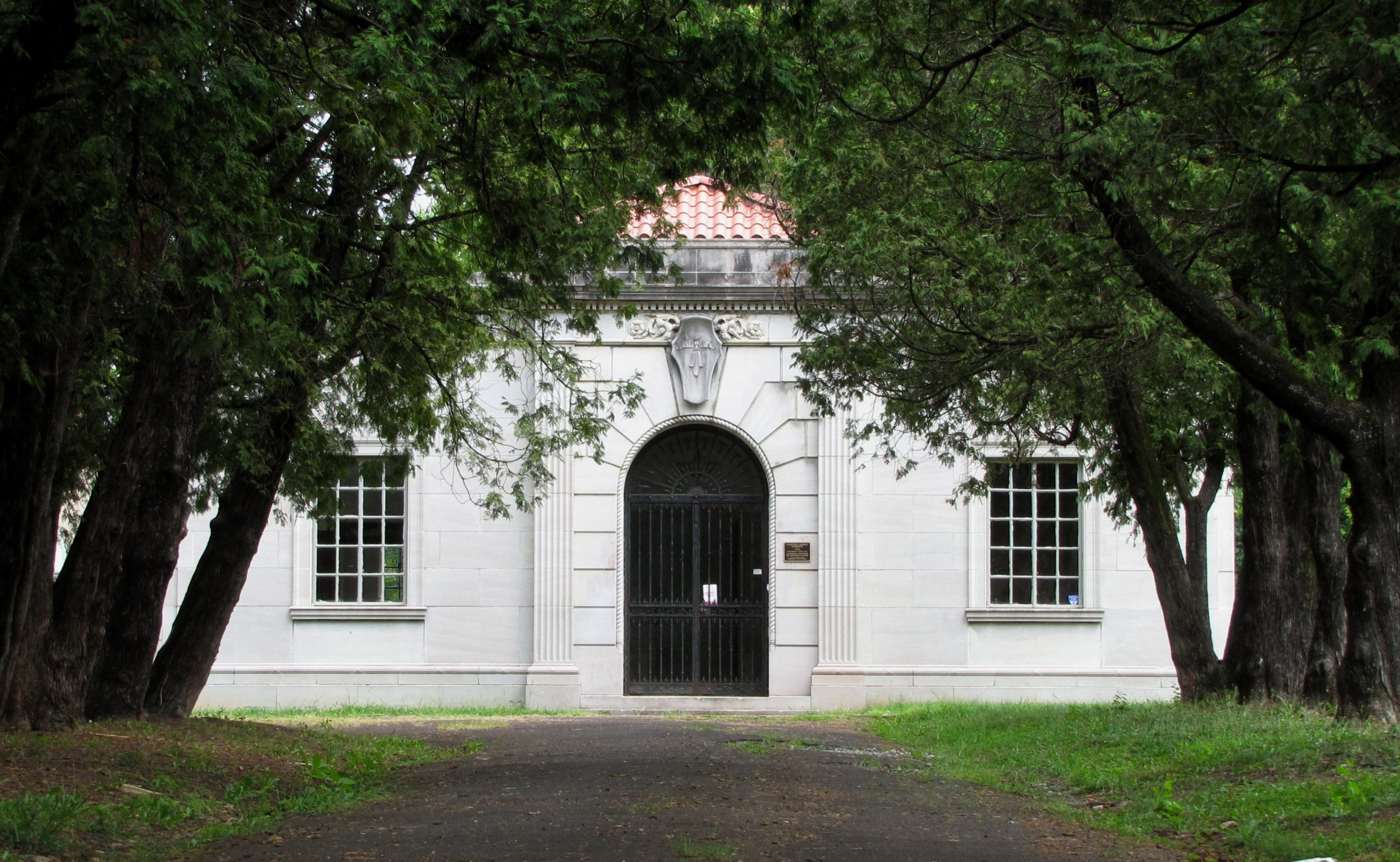
- Candoro Marble Works showroom

- Location within Tennessee Location within the United States
- Location: 681 Maryville Pike; Knoxville, Tennessee
- Coordinates: 35°55′58″N 83°55′20″W
- Area: 5.4 acres (22,000 m^{2})
- Built: 1914
- Architect: Charles I. Barber, multiple
- Architectural style: Beaux-Arts
- NRHP reference No.: 96001399
- Added to NRHP: December 4, 1996; July 22, 2005

The Candoro Marble Works was a marble cutting and polishing facility located in Knoxville, Tennessee, United States. Established as a subsidiary of the John J. Craig Company in 1914, the facility's marble products were used in the construction of numerous monumental buildings across the United States during the 1930s and 1940s. Although Candoro closed in 1982, independent marble fabricators continued using the facility until the early 21st century, when it was purchased by the preservation group, South Knox Heritage. In 1996, several of the facility's buildings were added to the National Register of Historic Places.

By the beginning of the 20th century, East Tennessee had become one of the nation's major suppliers of finished marble. The John J. Craig Company, which operated several quarries in the vicinity of Knoxville, was one of the region's top marble suppliers during this period. John J. Craig III, grandson of the company's founder, and three co-investors— F.C. Anderson, W.J. Donaldson, and S.A. Rodgers— established Candoro to cut and polish the company's quarried and imported marble. The name "Candoro" is a combination of the first letters of each co-founder's last name. The company's showroom and garage, completed in 1923, was designed by noted Knoxville architect Charles I. Barber (1887–1962).

== Location ==
The Candoro Marble Works is located in South Knoxville's Vestal community along Candora Road, spanning most of the north side of the road between its Maryville Pike (State Route 33) and Spruce Road intersections. The showroom is the easternmost building, lying adjacent to Maryville Pike, and is connected to Candora Road by an oft-photographed tree-lined allée. The large cutting facility lies to the west of the showroom and garage, and the finishing building lies immediately west of the cutting facility. A smaller building housing the boilers and company offices stands in front of the finishing building.

== History ==
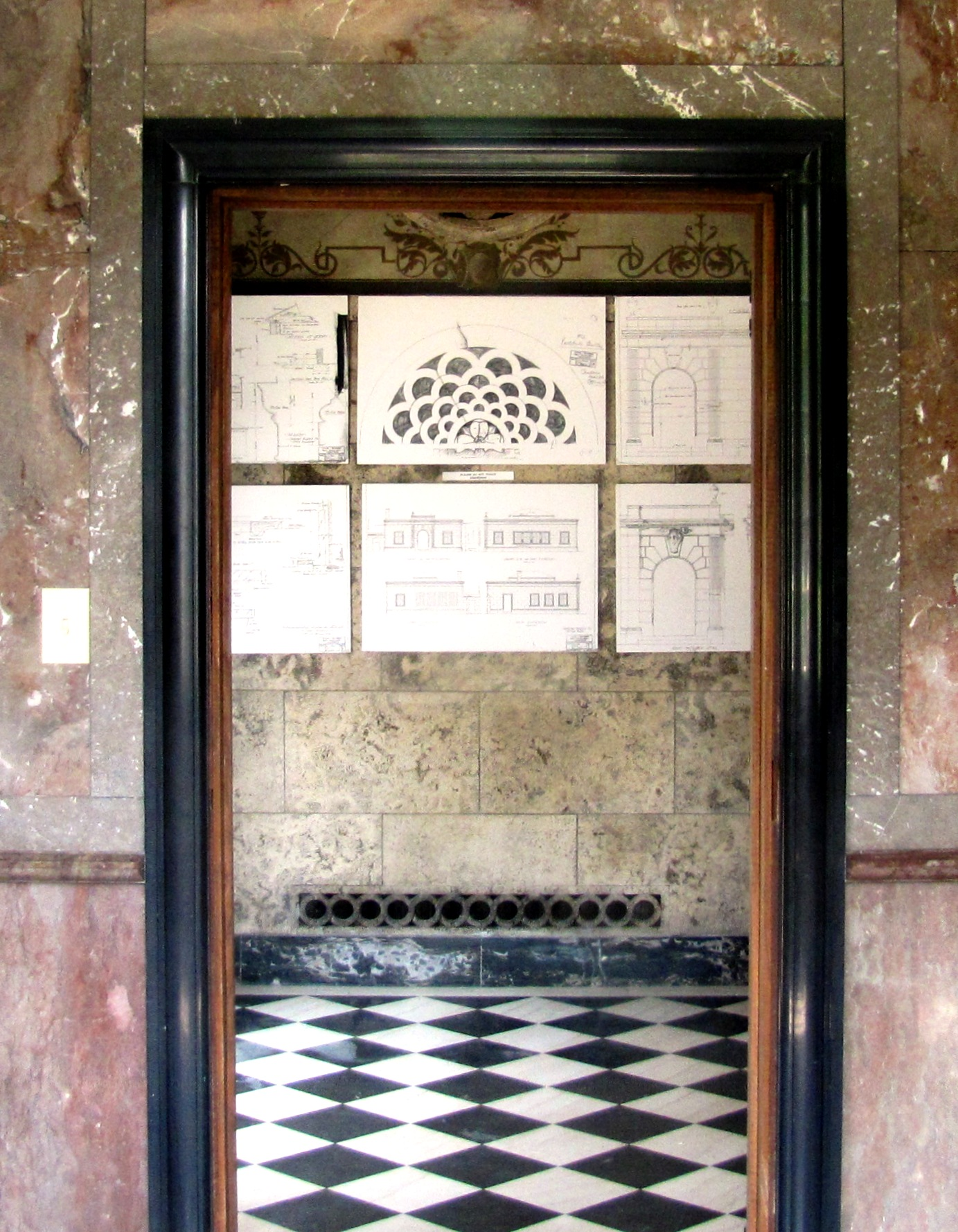
Showroom interior, showing pink marble walls and marble tile floor

In the years after the Civil War, East Tennessee experienced a quarrying boom that focused on a type of pinkish Holston Formation limestone known as "East Tennessee marble." By 1900, nearly a dozen companies were operating quarries or finishing facilities in and around Knoxville, giving the city the nickname, "The Marble City." The John J. Craig Company, one of the most successful of these companies, operated quarries near Friendsville in Blount County and near Concord in Knox County.

To convert his company's quarried marble into finished products, John J. Craig III established a subsidiary, the Candoro Marble Company, which built the Candoro Marble Works complex. The site in South Knoxville was chosen for its proximity to both the railroad and Goose Creek, the latter of which provided water for the complex's steam boiler, which powered the complex's massive cutting machinery in the years before cheap electricity was available. While the company initially used its own locally quarried stone, it gradually began to rely more and more on marble imported from Europe and South America.

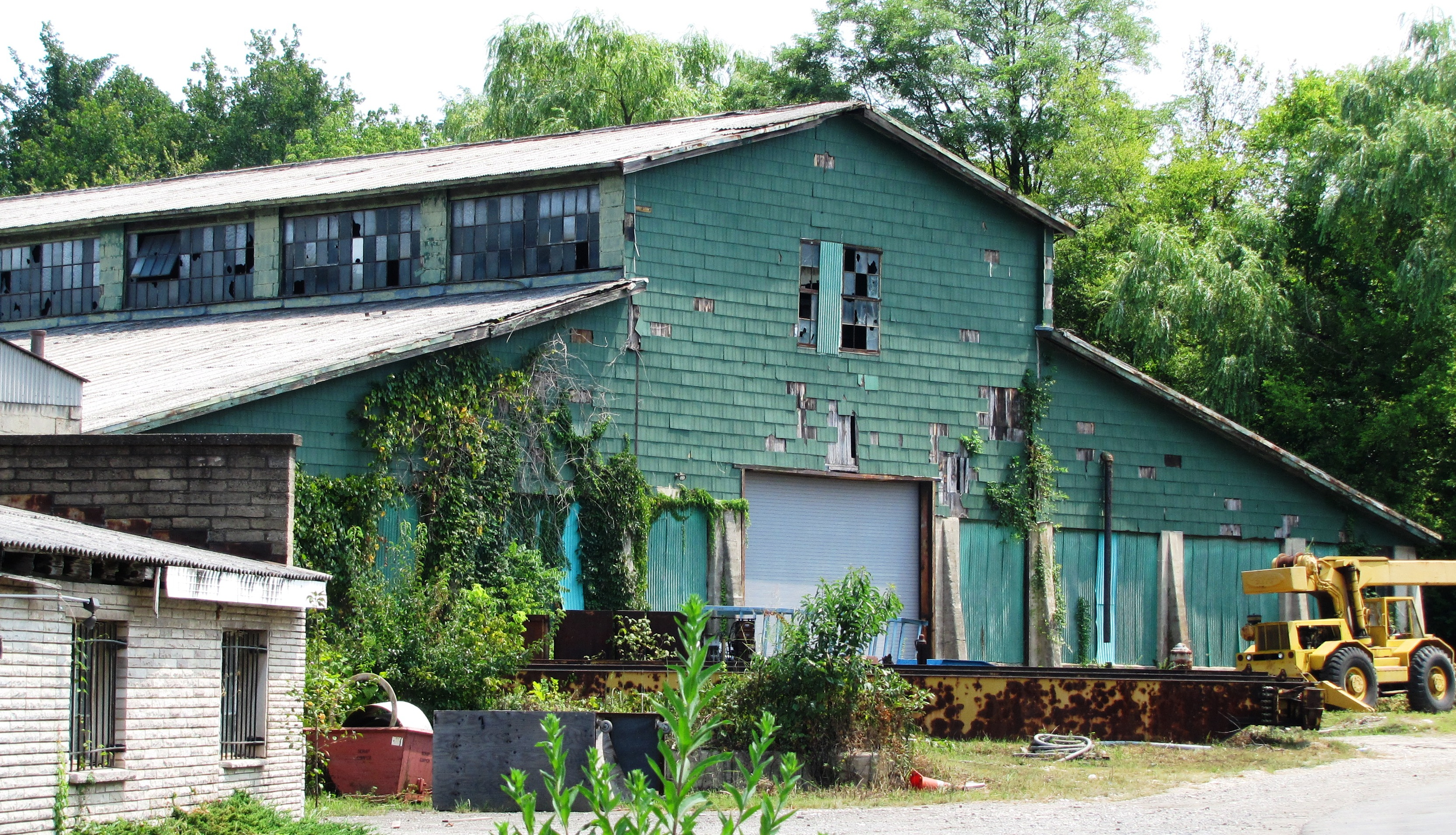
Cutting facility, built 1914

In 1927, Candoro hired Carrara, Italy-born stone carver Albert Milani (1892–1972) as its chief carver. During Milani's 40-year tenure, Candoro provided marble for buildings such as the Smithsonian Museum of History and Technology and the National Gallery of Art in Washington, as well as local buildings such as the Knoxville Post Office building. Notable hand-carvings by Milani include the History of the World relief at the Pennsylvania State Capitol and the four eagle sculptures flanking the entrances of the Knoxville Post Office. Milani's carvings were shipped to customers as far away as Pakistan and Japan.

The use of marble in building construction declined after World War II, and Candoro shut down operations in 1982. Independent marble fabricators used the company's facilities until the early 21st century, when a group of historic preservationists purchased the Candoro office building for preservation purposes and made the space available to the South Knoxville Arts and Heritage Center (later known as the Candoro Arts and Heritage Center). The South Knox Arts and Heritage Center initiated efforts to restore the Candoro office and showroom. Since 2001, the Candoro grounds have hosted the Vestival, a festival held annually in May that features live music and craft vendors. The Candoro Marble Building was acquired by the Aslan Foundation on April 15, 2014. In 2019, the Aslan Foundation embarked on a historic restoration that concluded with the building's re-opening in March 2021. The Candoro Marble Building is currently home to contemporary arts non-profit Tri-Star Arts, with their gallery space, artist studios, and arts programming. In addition, the Candoro Arts and Heritage Center volunteers will continue to present Vestival on the building's grounds as well as quarterly programming.

== Candoro Marble Works historic district ==
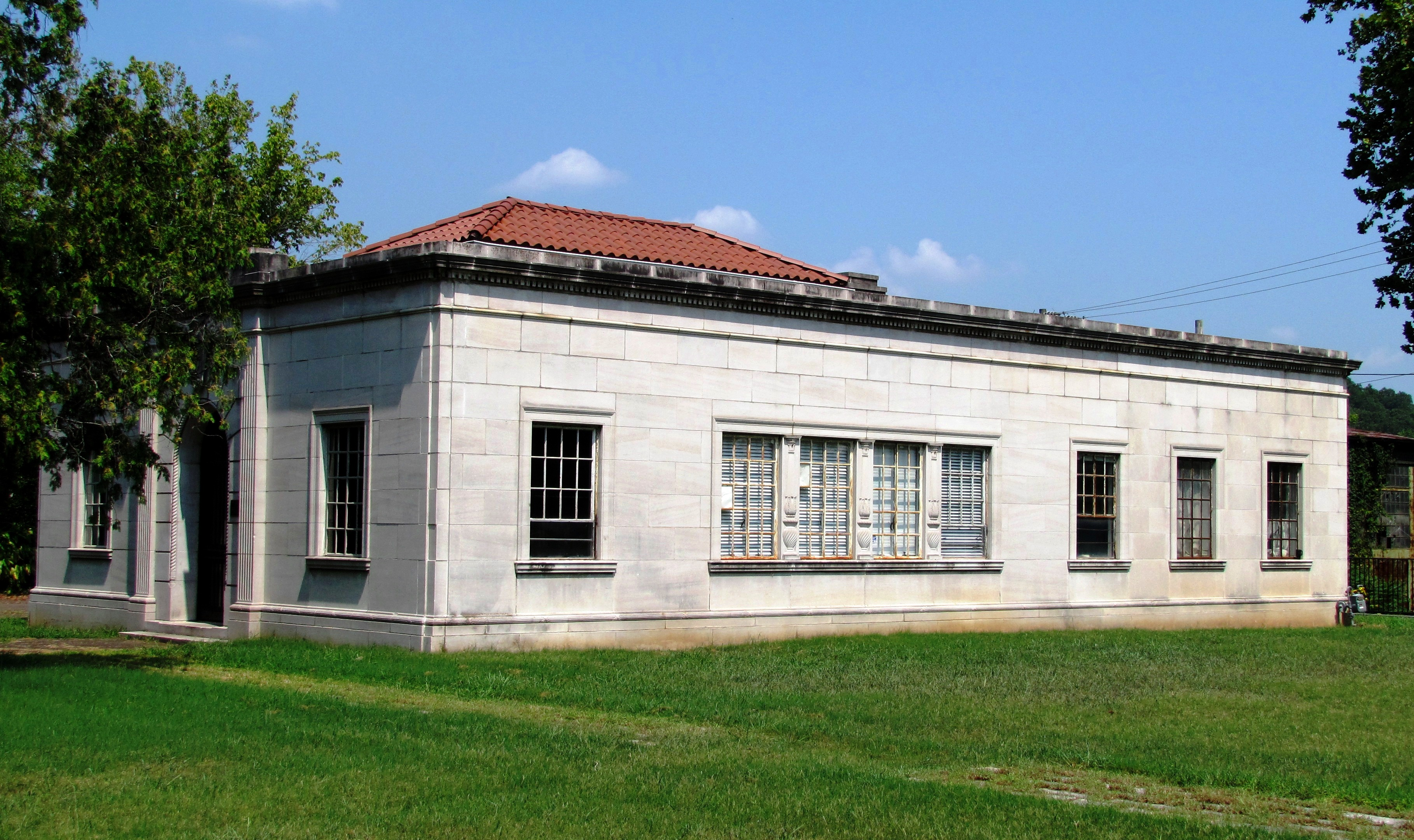
Showroom, viewed from Maryville Pike

The Candoro Marble Works complex was initially added to the National Register of Historic Places in 1996 for its role in Knoxville's early 20th century marble industry. In 2005, the complex's showroom and garage were relisted to include architecture in their area of importance. The complex's four water towers are listed as contributing structures, and a now-vacant marble yard behind the showroom is listed as a contributing site.

=== Showroom and garage ===
The Candoro Marble Works showroom is a two-story building with a marble veneer exterior completed in 1923. Architect Charles I. Barber of the firm Barber & McMurry designed the building primarily in the Beaux-Arts style, and Albert Milani executed the marble detailing. The building's facade features a hand-carved cartouche and floral motif and a wrought-iron door crafted by Philadelphia master blacksmith Samuel Yellin (1885–1940). The showroom's interior includes an entrance hall with polished travertine and frescoed plaster walls and a hand-carved marble rosette. Adjacent to the entrance hall is a room with East Tennessee pink marble walls. The building's floor consists of black-and-white marble tile. A second-story penthouse sits atop the showroom building.

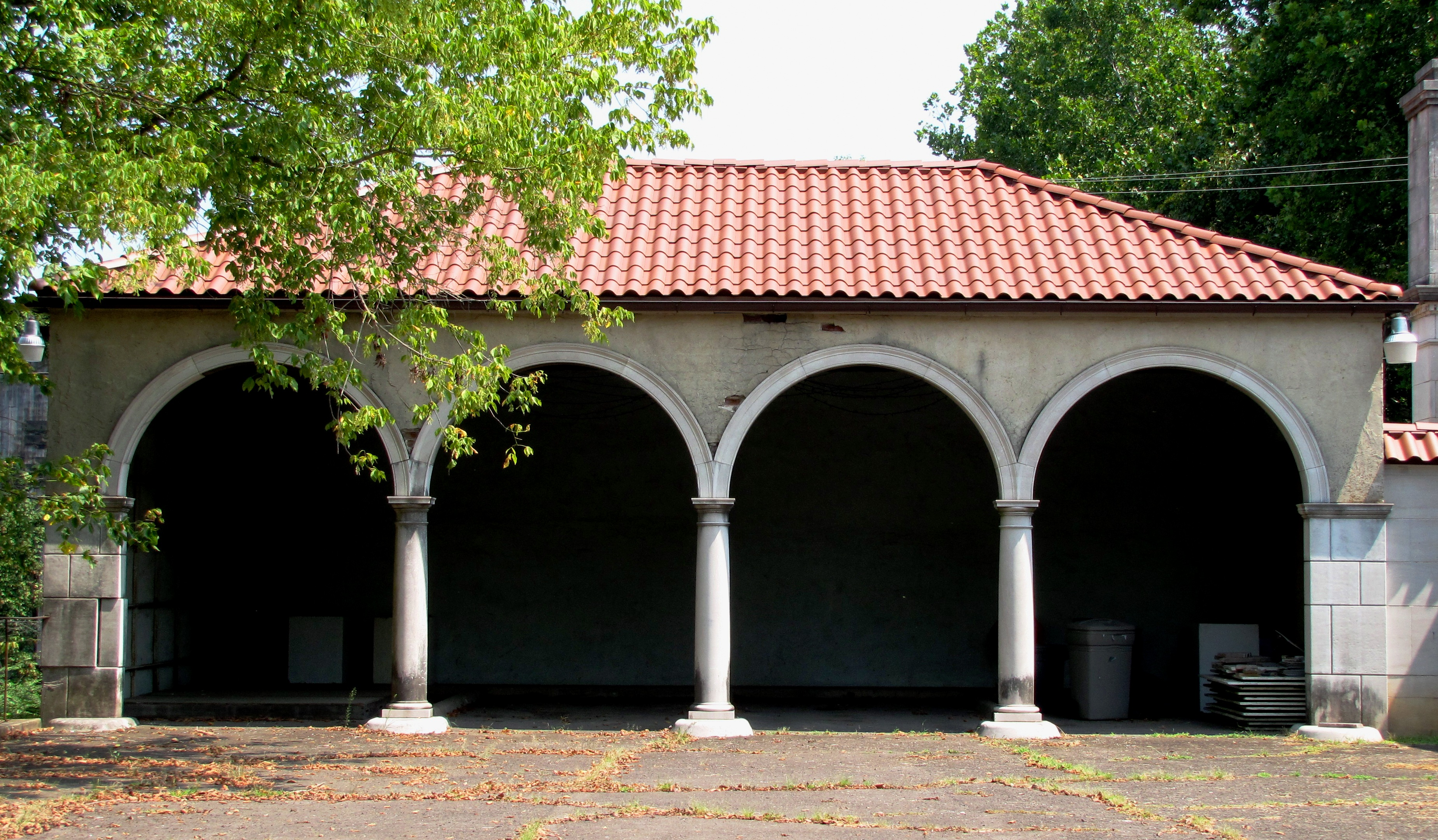
Garage

The garage, also designed by Barber, consists of four arched bays separated by four marble Tuscan columns carved by Milani. The lower half of the garage's exterior consists of the same marble veneer as the showroom, while the upper half is covered with stucco. The roof of the garage is covered with Roman tiles. A non-structural wall connects the showroom and garage.

=== Other contributing buildings ===
- The cutting facility, built in 1914, is a large steel-frame warehouse-style building.
- The polishing and shipping/receiving building, built in 1914, is a concrete-and-steel structure with angular roofs covering each individual bay. This building once housed the complex's polishing machinery and shipping bay.
- The boiler room and office, constructed in 1914, consists of a one-story front section that contained the complex's offices and a two-story back section that contained the complex's boiler. The interior of the office section contains East Tennessee marble floors, wainscoting, and railing.
