= United States Post Office and Custom House (New Haven, Connecticut) =

The United States Post Office and Custom House is a demolished building in New Haven, Connecticut. It fronted southeast on Church street and extended northwest to Gregson Street with an extension northerly along the latter to Center Street. It was initiated by an act of Congress approved August 4, 1854, which provided for a custom house and post office, 60 by 85 feet by 60 feet high, and the site was secured June 1, 1855, for $25,500, it having a frontage of 120 feet on Church and Gregson streets. A contract was awarded September 29, 1855, and was completed February 14, 1860, at a cost of $158,614.50.

An additional plot of ground fronting northwest, 38 feet 6 inches on Gregson Street, and northeast 52 feet 9 inches on Center Street was purchased March 18, 1893, for $23,000, and a contract entered into December 11, 1893, for another extension to the building. This was a one-story brick annex extending northeasterly along the front on Center Street. It was completed in March 1895. The first floor of the main building and extensions were used by the post office, the second floor by customs and internal revenue, and the third floor by federal courts. The building served the United States Government in that capacity until 1919 when it was sold to a private firm and became an apartment house until 1952. The structure was demolished in 1952.

== Gallery ==
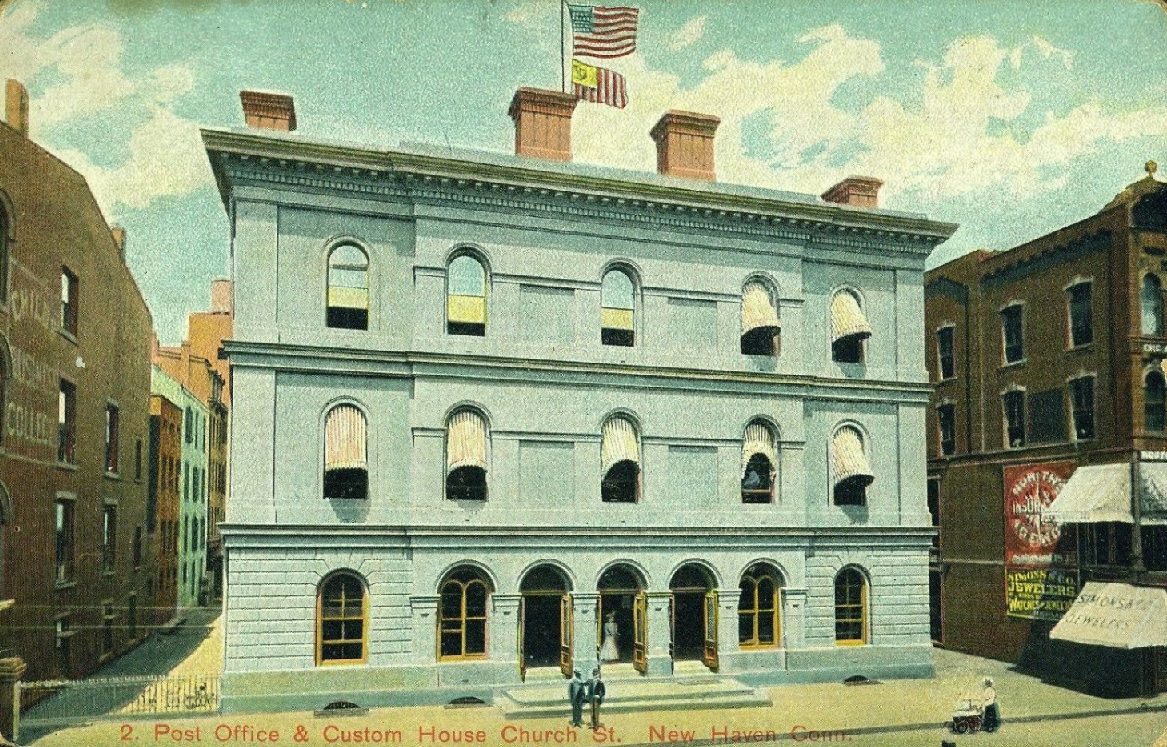
1901

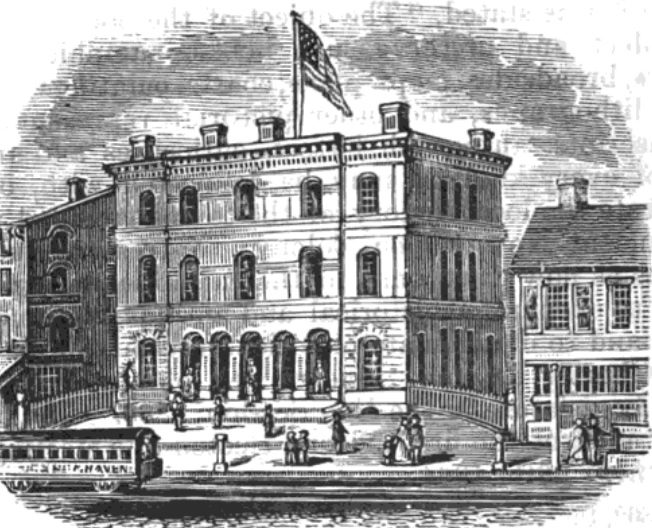
1860

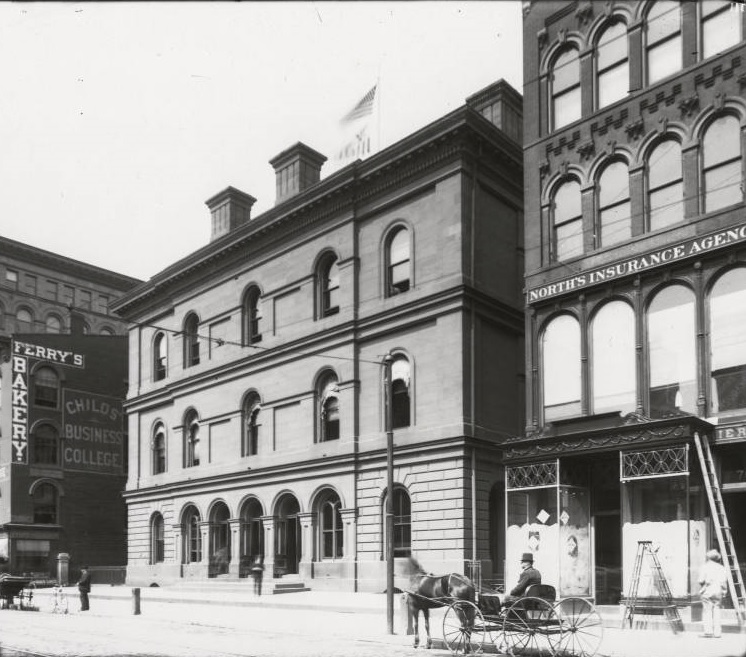
1904

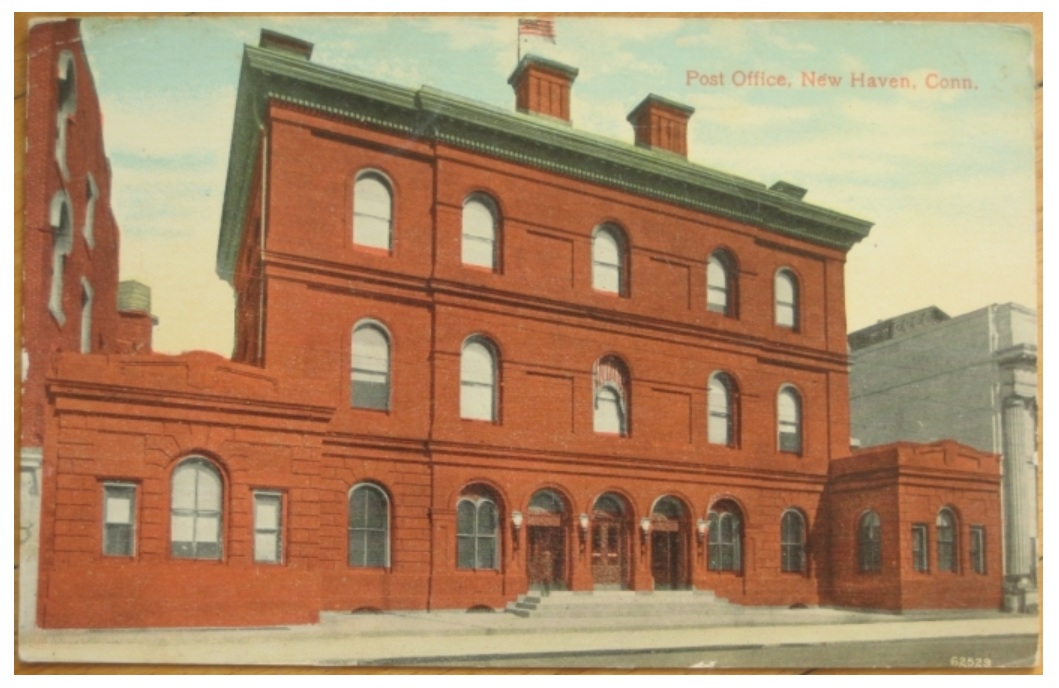
1900

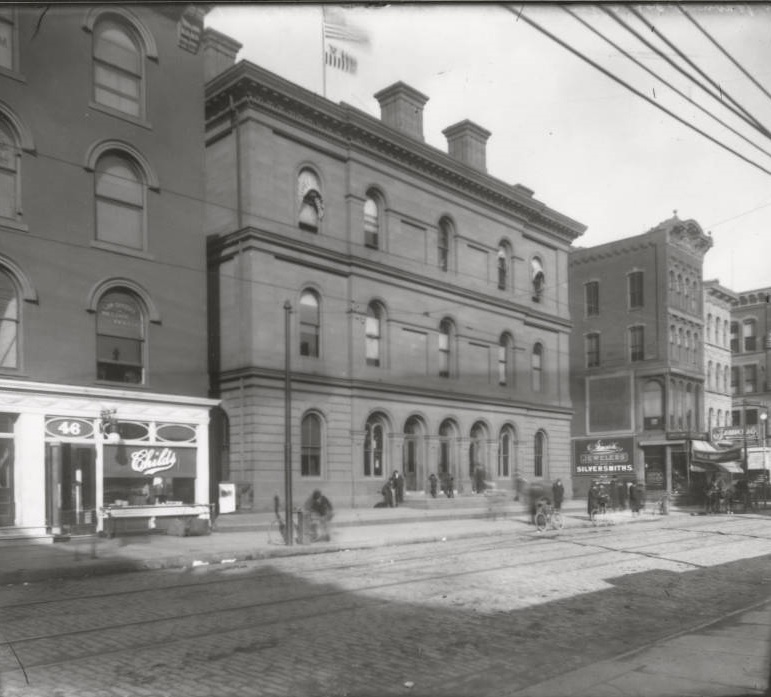
1900

== See also ==
- Richard C. Lee United States Courthouse
