= Statue of Po'pay =

Sculpture by Cliff Fragua

Po'pay
- Artist: Cliff Fragua
- Year: 2005
- Medium: Marble sculpture
- Location: Washington, D.C., United States

Po'pay is a statue of Po'pay (also known as Popé), a Tewa and one of the Pueblo leaders during the Pueblo Revolt against the Spanish in 1680. The statue was carved by Cliff Fragua, a sculptor from Jemez Pueblo, out of a solid block of Tennessee marble.

New Mexico was the last state to place its second statue in the National Statuary Hall Collection, making it the 100th statue placed there. Po'pay was the twentieth military leader, the twelfth religious leader, and joined six other Native Americans in the Collection.

== Description ==
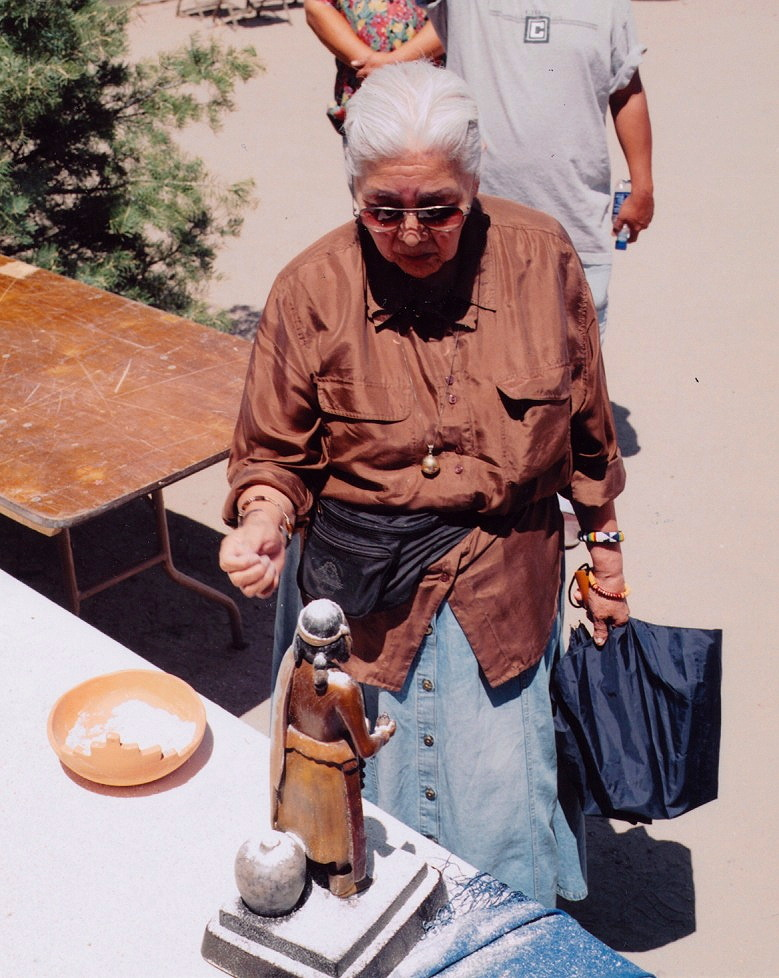
Blessing the statue at Ohkay Owingeh.

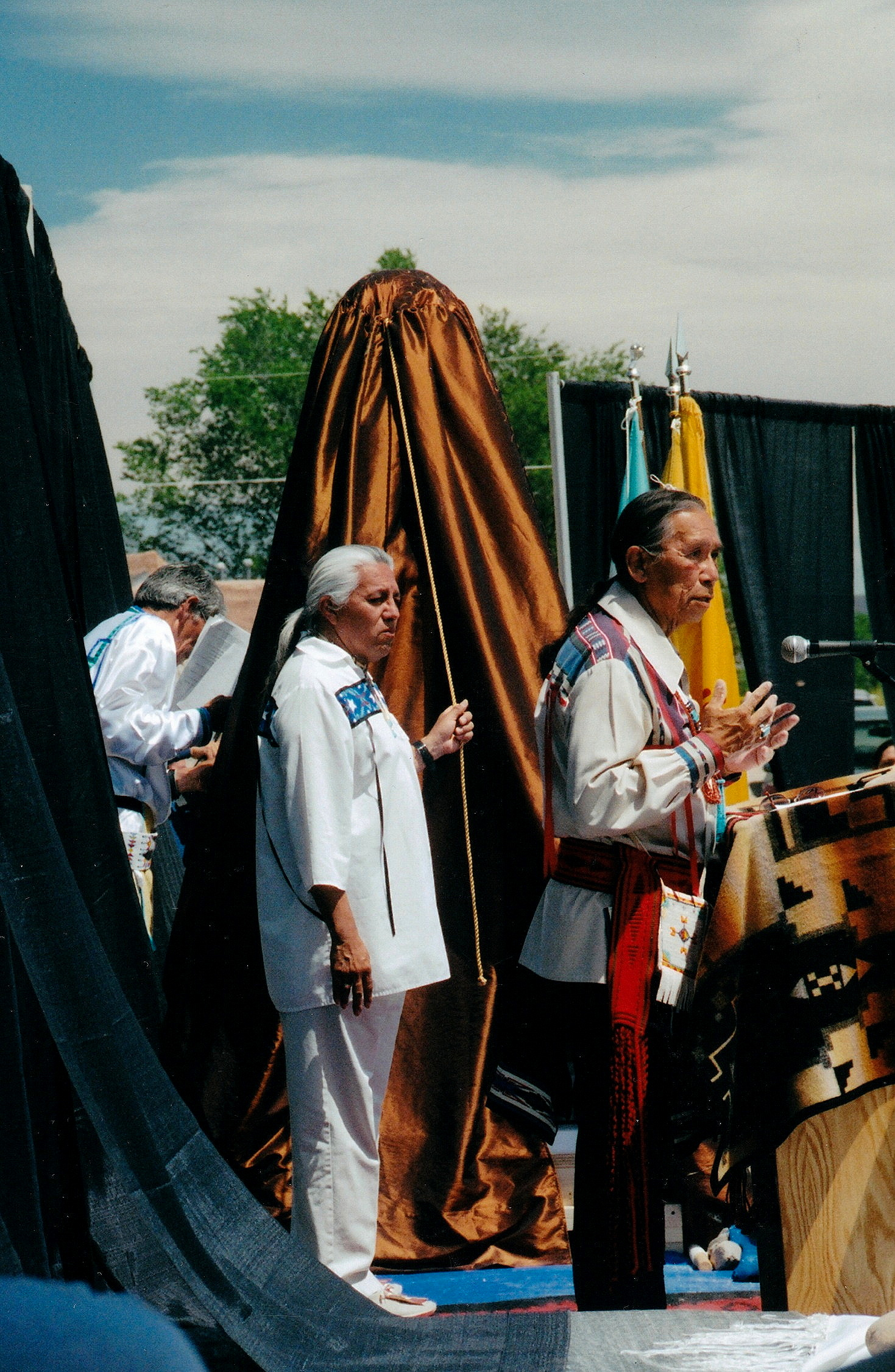
Unveiling of statue at Ohkay Owingeh pueblo

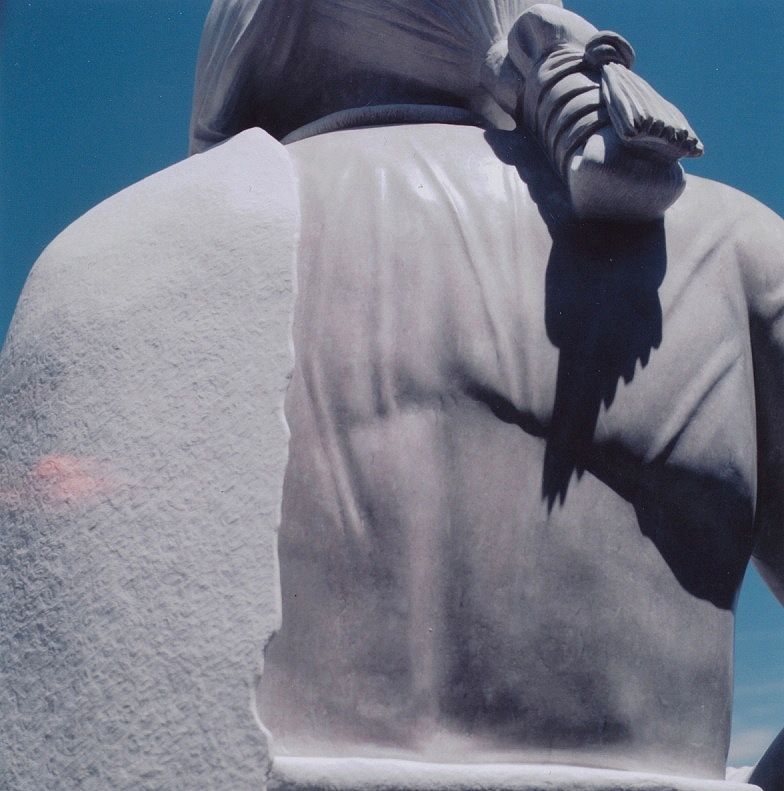
scars on statue

Po'pay is shown as a man with shoulder-length hair and a wrinkled face looking to the horizon, with scars from corporal punishment on his shoulders and back. He wears a headband, a shell necklace, a bracelet, a shawl, a skirt, and moccasin boots. He holds a counting rope used to plan the timing of the Pueblo Revolt, and a bear fetish.

== History ==
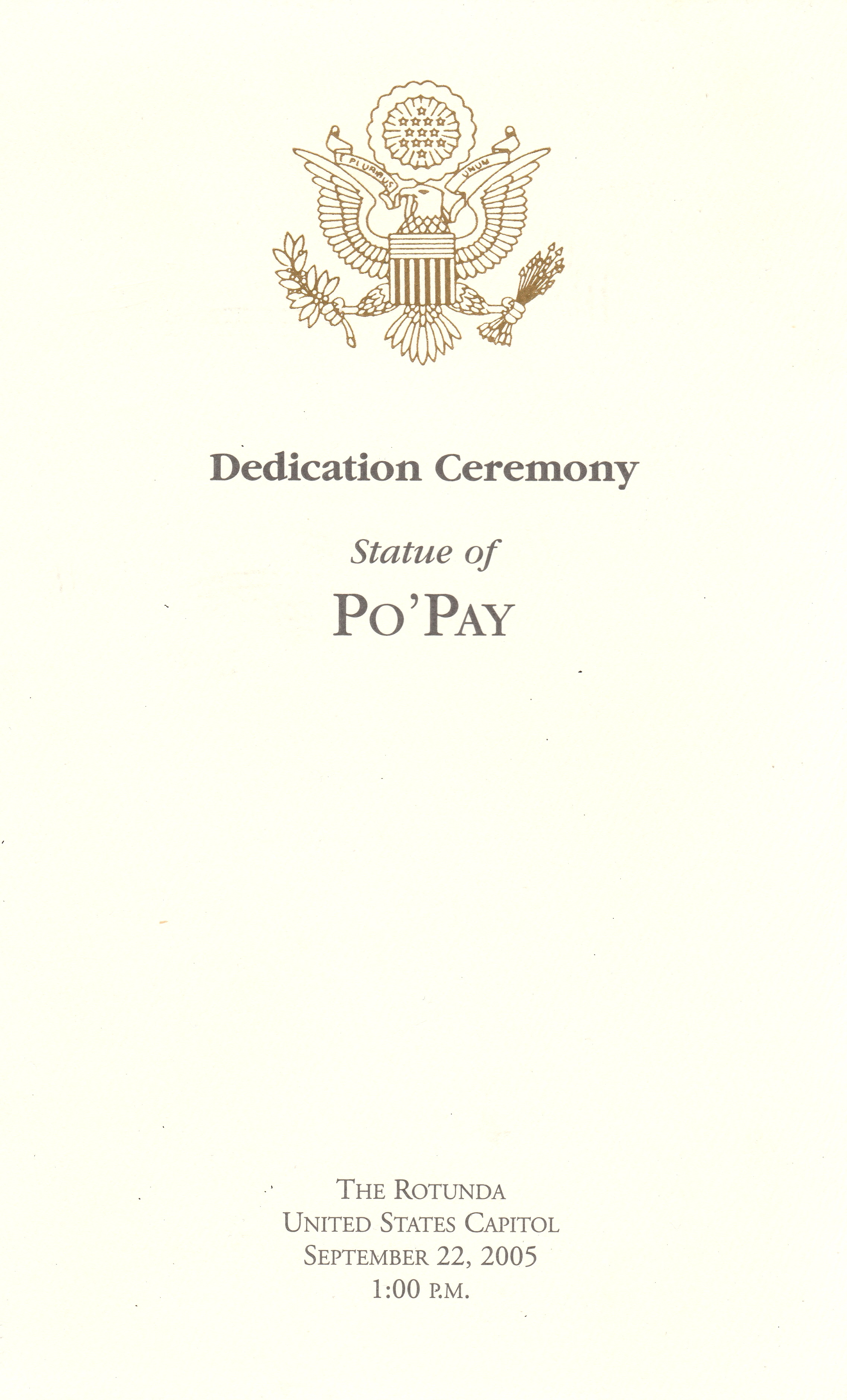
Scan of the program for the statue's dedication ceremony at the United States Capitol

In 1997, New Mexico Senate Bill 404 was introduced by senators Manny Aragon (D-Bernalillo) and Nick Salazar (D-Rio Arriba), which nominated Po'Pay to fill the second New Mexico spot in the Hall. The bill was passed and signed into law by Governor Gary E. Johnson. A Statuary Hall Commission was then established whose purpose was to select a sculptor and to raise funds. Fragua was selected as the sculptor.

Carved by Fragua in his studio at Jemez Pueblo over three years, the statue had its first public showing at Ohkay Owingeh pueblo on May 21, 2005, where Po'pay was from. There the statue was blessed before it was allowed to continue on the Washington, D.C., where it was unveiled in the Capitol rotunda on September 22, 2005.

== See also ==
- 2005 in art
