= Richard C. Lee United States Courthouse =

- United States Post Office and Court House
- U.S. National Register of Historic Places
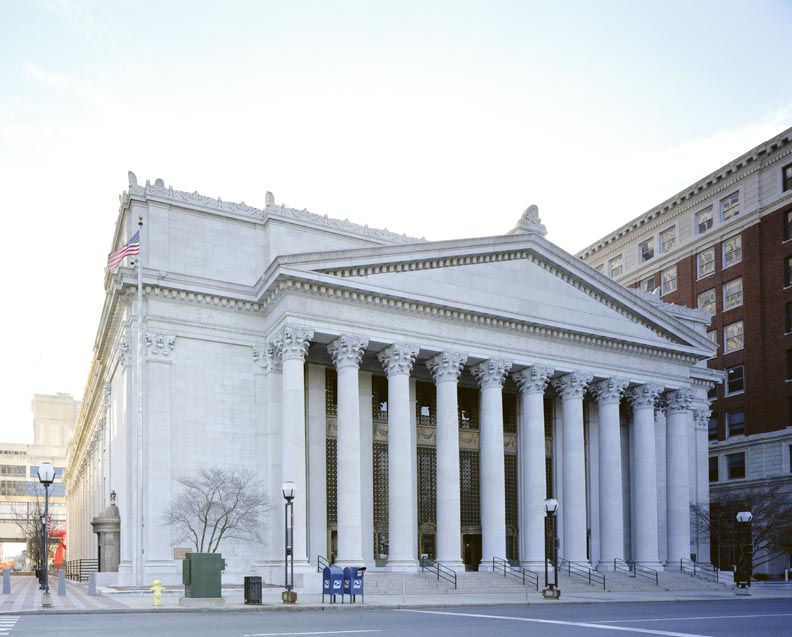
- The Richard C. Lee United States Courthouse

- Location within Connecticut Location within the United States
- Location: 145 Church Street, New Haven, Connecticut
- Coordinates: 41°18′24″N 72°55′30″W
- Built: 1919
- Architect: James Gamble Rogers
- Architectural style: Classical Revival
- NRHP reference No.: 15000586
- Added to NRHP: September 14, 2015

The Richard C. Lee United States Courthouse is a monumental courthouse of the United States District Court for the District of Connecticut, located on the east side of the New Haven Green. Built between 1913 and 1919, the structure was spared from a planned demolition in the 1960s, and instead renovated to continue its useful life. For many decades, it also served as a post office, although the post office moved to another location in 1979. It is an excellent example of Classical Revival architecture. It was listed on the National Register of Historic Places in 2015.

== Building history ==
In 1910, landscape architect Frederick Law Olmsted Jr. and architect Cass Gilbert, two of the most prominent designers working in America at the time, produced a city planning document for New Haven. They advised that the style, materials, and scale of the new courthouse and post office should respect the character of existing public buildings around the Green. James Gamble Rogers designed the building to achieve those goals, and it was constructed between 1913 and 1919. Rogers was also the architect for structures at Yale University, his alma mater. The building was the last to be designed under the auspices of the Tarsney Act (1890 - 1912), which allowed the United States Treasury Department to hire private architects rather than use only designers employed by the federal government. A cornerstone dedication ceremony was held in 1914. Former President William Howard Taft, then a professor at Yale Law School, spoke at the event, and the text of his speech was placed in the cornerstone, along with other mementos.

The courthouse was slated for demolition in the 1960s as part of an urban renewal plan. However, a coalition of federal judges and local historic preservationists rallied to save it. After much negotiation, the landmark was restored in the early 1980s at a cost of $7.3 million. Although some interior spaces were modified, the restoration respected the original character, and many historic components remain intact. In 1998, the building was renamed to honor Richard C. Lee, a former New Haven mayor who was a pivotal figure in the building's preservation as well as the city's revitalization.

== Architecture ==
The Classical Revival architecture style of architecture chosen for the Richard C. Lee U.S. Courthouse was commonly used for federal building design during the early twentieth century, because officials believed it conveyed the dignity of the federal government. The courthouse displays several hallmarks of the style, including the colossal portico (entrance porch with columns) and pediment (triangular gable end). The columns have Corinthian capitals with carved eagles and leaves. Niches flank the portico. The exterior of the building is clad in Tennessee marble, and the exterior stairs are pink Milford granite. Bronze window sashes, grilles, and the revolving doors provide contrast to the pale gray exterior.

Important citizens in New Haven's history inspired the inscriptions on the exterior. The frieze contains words from a sermon delivered by Reverend John Davenport in 1639: "Wisdom hath builded her house; she hath hewn out her seven pillars" (a quote from Proverbs). Davenport was referring to the seven men who were selected to serve as the first General Court, and their names are inscribed on the building. The upper walls of the interior light court were incised with the names of five other prominent New Haven citizens and three military heroes. A carved band tops the building and includes coquillage, which are stylized seashells. An acroterion, the ornament at the apex of the gable, is also a stylized shell.

The interior retains many original features and rich finishes. Marble floors and pilasters (attached columns) are found in the ornate entrance lobby. The coffered (recessed) ceiling is intricately detailed with rosettes. The interior wall contains an elaborate bronze screen that led to the original postal workroom. Other original features that remain include writing desks, radiator grilles, and pendant light fixtures, which were specially designed by Rogers.

The walls of the main stair and elevator lobbies are clad in the same Tennessee marble as the exterior. However, the marble was finished to reveal more pink tones. Ceilings in this area are vaulted plaster overlaid with gold leaf. Ornate bronze elevator fronts and grilles remain. On the second floor, the courtroom lobby is lined with twenty monolithic, Tennessee marble columns with bronze scrolled Ionic capitals. Marble flooring, wainscot, and benches contribute to the opulent finishes. A plaster cornice and coffered ceiling are painted in tones derived from the marble.

In a 1919 article featured in Architectural Forum, the courtroom was described as a "dignified, sumptuous room of perfect acoustic qualities." The lavish wall treatments combine fluted pilasters and paneling in quarter-sawn white oak that was stained a light olive color. The ornate plaster cornice and ceiling beams are finished to resemble the oak walls and highlighted with gold leaf.

Remarkably, very few alterations were made to the building throughout the years. By 1980, however, it had fallen into disrepair. From 1982 to 1985, it underwent a massive renovation and restoration. The work respected historic integrity while updating spaces to meet the needs of the courts and safety requirements.

== Significant events ==
- 1638: New Haven Green created
- 1910: Frederick Law Olmsted and Cass Gilbert produce city plan
- 1913: Courthouse site purchased
- 1913-1919: U.S. Post Office and Courthouse constructed
- 1965: Building slated for demolition
- 1979: Postal service vacates building
- 1982-1985: Renovation and restoration
- 1998: Building renamed to honor former New Haven Mayor Richard C. Lee

== Building facts ==
- Location: 141 Court Street on the New Haven Green
- Architect: James Gamble Rogers
- Construction Dates: 1913 - 1919
- Landmark Status: Eligible for the National Register of Historic Places
- Architectural Style: Classical Revival
- Primary Material: Tennessee Marble
- Prominent Features: Classical Portico; Ornate Courtroom; Elaborate Lobbies

== See also ==
- United States Post Office and Custom House (New Haven, Connecticut), 1860-1919
- National Register of Historic Places listings in New Haven, Connecticut
