= Cliff Fragua =

Native American sculptor and stone carver

- Born: Clifford Fragua; 1955 (age 70–71); Jemez Pueblo, New Mexico, U.S.
- Citizenship: Jemez Pueblo
- Education: Institute of American Indian Arts, San Francisco Art Institute
- Known for: sculpture
- Notable work: Popé
- Movement: Native American sculpture
- Website: singingstonestudio.com

Cliff Fragua (born 1955) is a Jemez Pueblo sculptor and stone carver. He is the only Native American sculptor to have a work installed in Statuary Hall of the United States Capitol; it is the second of works representing New Mexico and the 100th and last of these works to be added. The sculpture is of Popé, a great Pueblo Leader during the late 1600s who united the Pueblo people and defeated the Spaniards in what is now New Mexico. Fragua traveled to Blount County, Tennessee to hand select his Tennessee Pink Marble block from the quarry owned and operated by the Tennessee Marble Company.

== Early life and education ==
Born and raised on Jemez Pueblo, New Mexico, Fragua is an enrolled member of the tribe. He began studying sculpture at the Institute of American Indian Arts in Santa Fe. He transferred to the San Francisco Art Institute. Following this, he attended the Pietrasanta Stone Workshop in Pietrasanta, Italy, where he studied stone carving.

== Career ==
Fragua is a sculptor and stone carver. His work has been described as "based in Native American themes" and "shows pride for his culture and a deep understanding of the inherent spirituality of the stone."

He was commissioned by the state of New Mexico to make a sculpture of Po'pay, leader of the successful Pueblo Revolt in 1680 against the Spanish colonists. In 2005, his 10-foot-tall Tennessee marble statue was installed in the National Statuary Hall in the Capitol Building in Washington D.C., the second representing New Mexico and the 100th and last to be added. He is the only Native American sculptor to have a work in the hall.

Fragua owns and operates Singing Stone Studio in Jemez Pueblo, New Mexico.
