= Ijams Nature Center =

Nature preserve in Knox County, Tennessee, United States

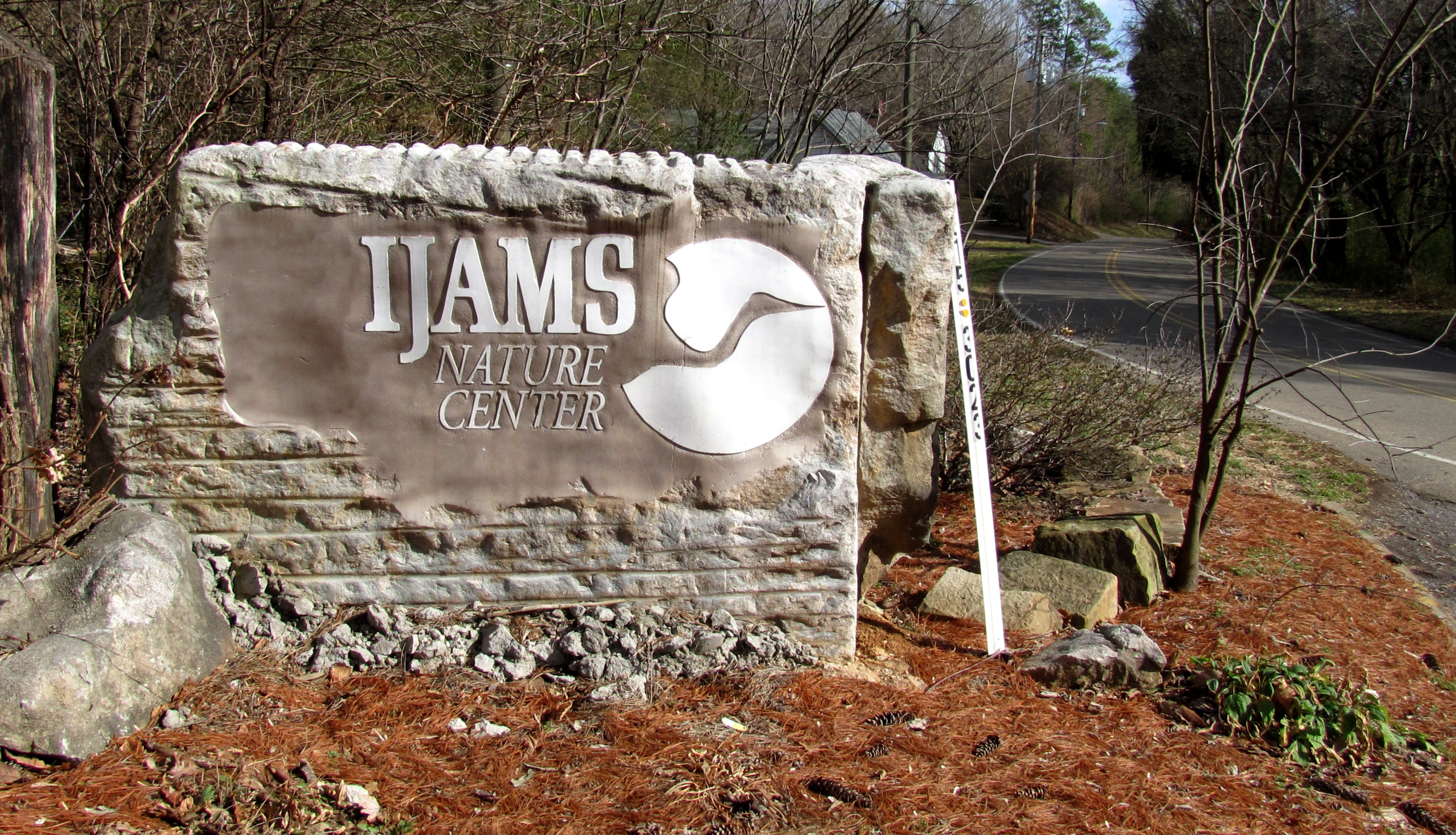
- Interactive map of Ijams Nature Center
- Location: Knoxville, Tennessee
- Coordinates: 35.9565°N 83.8668°W
- Created: 1975
- Operator: City of Knoxville
- Open: Year Around
- Website: www.ijams.org

Ijams Nature Center is a 336-acre (1.36 km^{2}) nature park in Knoxville, Tennessee, United States. Opened in 1975, it features over 14 miles of multi-use trails through the rugged terrain of the former Mead's and Ross Marble Quarries, a 25-acre (100,000 m^{2}) quarry lake offering fishing, padding, and swimming, and a public river access dock.

By 2025, it was one of the largest nature education centers in the country, serving more than 620,000 visitors yearly.

== History ==
In 1910, ornithologist Harry Pearl "HP" Ijams and his wife, gardener Alice Yoe Ijams, purchased 20 acres of land along the Tennessee River.

In 1923, they donated part of their property to help establish the local Girl Scouts organization, which created Camp Mary Ijams along the river.

In 1966, wanting to ensure the family legacy, the Knoxville Garden Club and Knox County Council of Garden Clubs applied for an open space grant, and the City of Knoxville purchased the land. Ijams Nature Park was dedicated in 1968 and has been managed by the Ijams Nature Center staff and board of directors since then.

On November 8, 1975, the park became Ijams Nature Center, Inc., a nonprofit 501(c)(3) organization.

In 1991, Ijams Nature Center tripled its size by acquiring 60 adjacent acres. The expansion prompted the commissioning of a master plan aimed at enhancing educational programs and facilities, involving McCarty Holsaple McCarty Architects and landscape architect Ross/Fowler P.C. In 1997, as part of the master plan, a 14,230-square-foot (1,322 m^{2}) visitor center opened.

In the early 2000s, the nature center took on management of Mead's and Ross Marble Quarries. In 2025, the organization acquired all of the property within its boundaries, expanding the park to 320 acres (1.3 km^{2}).
