= List of pledges of allegiance and salutes to flags of U.S. states =

The following is a list of pledges of allegiance or salutes to the flags of states of the United States of America.

== List of pledges and salutes by state ==
State	Pledge	Notes
Arkansas	"I salute the Arkansas Flag with its diamond and stars. We pledge our loyalty to thee."	Written by author Virginia Belcher Brock.
Georgia	"I pledge allegiance to the Georgia Flag and to the principles for which it stands: Wisdom, Justice, Moderation, and Courage." — Pledge of allegiance to the Georgia state flag	
Kentucky	"I pledge allegiance to the Kentucky flag, and to the Sovereign State for which it stands, one Commonwealth, blessed with diversity, natural wealth, beauty, and grace from on High."	Adopted in 2000.
Louisiana	"I pledge allegiance to the flag of the state of Louisiana and to the motto for which it stands: A state, under God, united in purpose and ideals, confident that justice shall prevail for all of those abiding here."	Adopted in 1981.
Michigan	"I pledge allegiance to the flag of Michigan, and to the state for which it stands, two beautiful peninsulas united by a bridge of steel, where equal opportunity and justice to all is our ideal."	Written by Harold G. Coburn and officially adopted in 1972.
Mississippi	"I salute the flag of Mississippi and the sovereign state for which it stands with pride in her history and achievements and with confidence in her future under the guidance of Almighty God."	Adopted in 1942.
New Mexico	"I salute the flag of the state of New Mexico, the Zia symbol of perfect friendship among united cultures." — New Mexico Statutes and Court Rules, Section 12-3-3 "Saludo la bandera del estado de Nuevo México, el símbolo zía de amistad perfecta, entre culturas unidas." — New Mexico Statutes and Court Rules, Section 12-3-7	
North Carolina	"I salute the flag of North Carolina and pledge to the Old North State love, loyalty, and faith."	Adopted in 2007.
Ohio	"I salute the flag of the state of Ohio and pledge to the Buckeye State respect and loyalty." — Ohio Rev. Code §5.013. "Pledge to the state flag".	Adopted in 2002.
Oklahoma	"I salute the Flag of the State of Oklahoma: Its symbols of peace unite all people."	Adopted by the state legislature in 1982.
South Carolina	"I salute the flag of South Carolina and pledge to the Palmetto State love, loyalty and faith."	Adopted in 1966.
South Dakota	"I pledge loyalty and support to the flag and state of South Dakota, land of sunshine, land of infinite variety."	
Tennessee	"Three white stars on a field of blue God keep them strong and ever true It is with pride and love that we Salute the Flag of Tennessee." — Lucy Steele Harrison, First salute to the flag of Tennessee, TN Code § 4-1-329(a) (2024) "Flag of Tennessee, I salute thee To thee I pledge my allegiance with My affection, my service and my life." — Miss John Bostick, Second salute to the flag of Tennessee, TN Code § 4-1-329(b) (2024)	Adopted in 2006.
Texas	"Honor the Texas flag; I pledge allegiance to thee, Texas, one state under God, one and indivisible."	
Virginia	"I salute the flag of Virginia, with reverence and patriotic devotion to the 'Mother of States and statesmen', which it represents - the 'Old Dominion', where liberty and independence were born."	The resolution establishing the pledge was signed by Governor Thomas Stanley in 1954.
