= Po'pay =

Tewa religious leader (1630–1692)

- Poˀpʼay
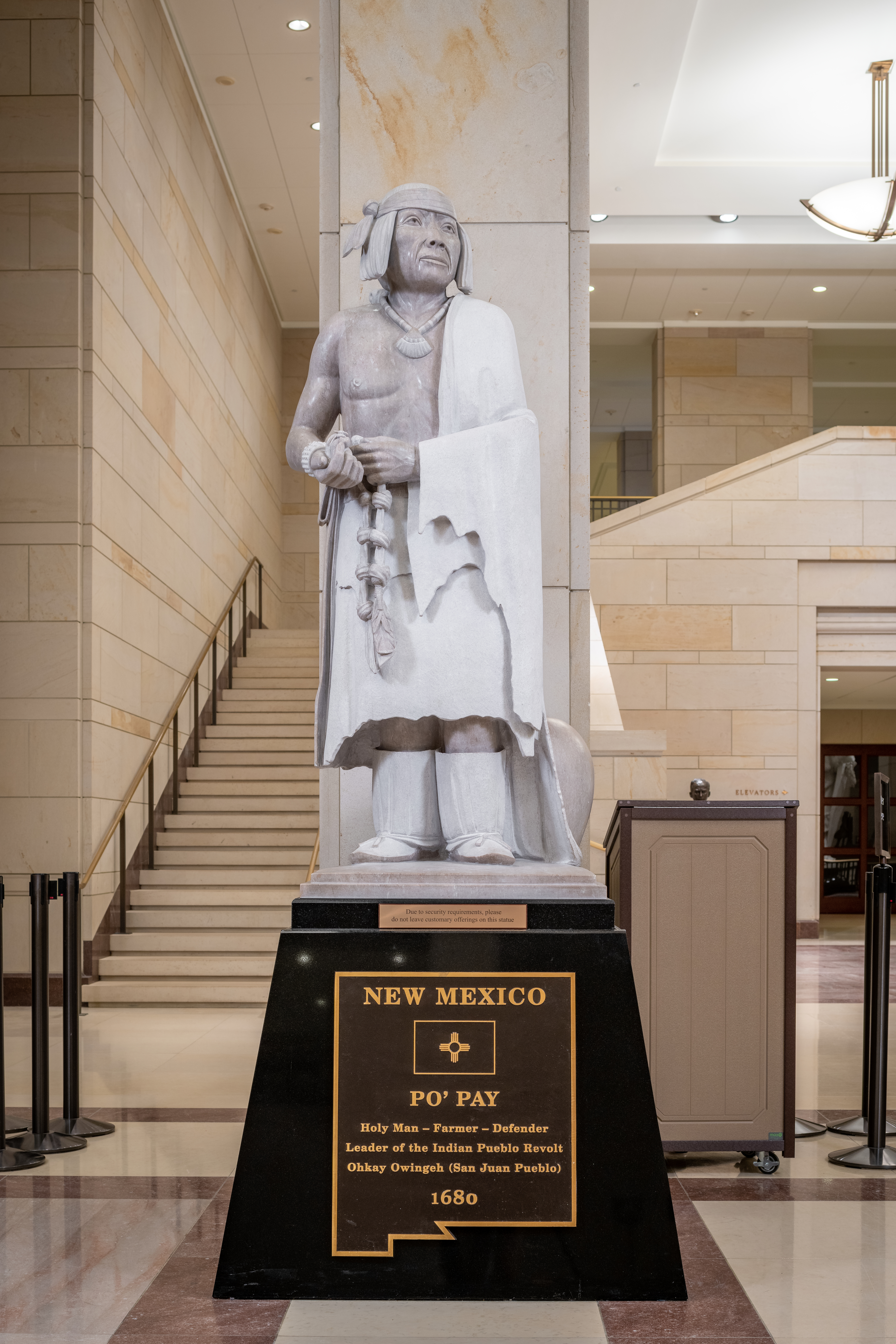
- Statue of Po'pay by Cliff Fragua (2005) representing New Mexico in the National Statuary Hall

Leader of the Pueblo peoples
- In office August 10, 1680 – c. 1688
- Preceded by: Office established
- Succeeded by: Office disestablished

Personal details
- Born: c. 1630 Ohkay Owingeh, New Spain
- Died: c. 1688 (aged 57–58)

Po'pay, (Note: /ˈpoʊpeɪ/ POH-pay) sometimes spelled Popé, (Tewa: Poˀpʼay, pronounced [pòʔpʼèː], lit. 'ripe squash'; c. 1630 – c. 1688) was a Tewa religious leader from Ohkay Owingeh, who led the Pueblo Revolt against Spanish colonial rule. In 1680, the Pueblo expelled the Spanish colonists from New Mexico and prevented their return for twelve years, in what has been described as the most successful Indigenous revolt against European colonial rule in what is now the United States. After the revolt, Po'pay attempted to exercise authority over the Pueblo communities, but opposition to his leadership soon emerged.

== Background ==
Spanish rule of the Pueblo Indians of the Rio Grande valley of New Mexico began in 1598. Although they numbered 40,000 to 80,000 people at that time, the many independent towns, often speaking different languages and hostile to each other, were unable to unite in opposition to the Spanish. Revolts against Spanish rule were frequent, but the Spanish ruthlessly repressed dissent. The Pueblo suffered abuses from Spanish overlords, soldiers, priests, and their Amerindian allies, many from Tlaxcala. In particular, the Spanish suppressed the religious ceremonies of the Pueblo. The effects of violence, forced labor, and European diseases (against which they had no immunity) reduced the Pueblo population to about 15,000 by the latter years of the 17th century.

Po'pay appears in history in 1675 as one of 47 religious leaders of the northern Pueblo arrested by Juan Francisco Trevino's government for "witchcraft." Three were executed and one committed suicide. The others were whipped, imprisoned in Santa Fe, and sentenced to be sold into slavery. Seventy Pueblo warriors showed up at the governor's office and demanded, politely but persistently, that Po'pay and the others be released. The governor complied, probably in part because the colony was being seriously targeted by Apaches and Navajo warring parties and he could not afford to risk a Pueblo revolt. Po'pay was described as a "fierce and dynamic individual…who inspired respect bordering on fear in those who dealt with him.

After his release, Po'pay retired to the remote Taos Pueblo and began planning a rebellion. Po'pay's message was simple: destroy the Spanish and their influence and go back to the old ways of life that had given the Pueblos relative peace, prosperity, and independence. The Pueblo revolt displayed "all the classic characteristics of a revitalization movement...the emergence of a charismatic leader, the development of a core group of followers who spread the prophet's message to the wider public; and, ultimately the successful transformation of Pueblo cultures and communities."

Po'pay began secret negotiations with leaders from all other pueblos. They agreed to begin the revolt on August 13, 1680, and runners were sent out to each Pueblo with knotted cords, the number of knots corresponding to the days left before the revolt was to begin. The revolt actually began before that. The measure of the Pueblo's hatred of the Spanish is indicated by the fact that he was able to keep the plans secret, even though they involved many different leaders and towns. Po'pay murdered his own son-in-law, Nicolás Búa, because he feared he might betray the plot to the Spanish. Only the Tiguex area, close to the seat of Spanish power in Santa Fe and perhaps the most acculturated of the Pueblos, declined to join in the revolt. The Southern Piros were apparently not invited to join the revolt.

== Pueblo Revolt ==
The Pueblo revolt was typical of millenarian movements in colonial societies. Popé promised that, once the Spanish were killed or expelled, the ancient Pueblo gods would reward them with health and prosperity. Popé's plan was that the inhabitants of each Pueblo would rise up and kill the Spanish in their area and then all would advance on Santa Fe to kill or expel all the remaining Spanish. The date set for the uprising was August 11, 1680. Popé dispatched runners to all the Pueblos carrying knotted cords. Pedro Omtua and Nicolas Catua were the two young men. On August 8, 1680, two young men from Tesuque set out for Tanogeh (Tano villages) early in the morning. Their first contact occurred in Pecos. Unfortunately, Fray Fernandao De Velasco was informed right away by Christian Indians that two Tewa young men had visited the war chief's house. After leaving Pecos, the two Tesuque runners continued on to Galisteo, San Cristobal, and San Marcos.

The last few years had been relatively quiet and free from internal dissent, and the Spanish in the capital city of Santa Fe were astonished as a report came to the governor early in the morning of August 10 that a Spanish priest had been killed at a Pueblo only nine miles from Santa Fe. By August 15, 1,000 Spaniards had taken refuge in the Governor's palace in Santa Fe, and they were besieged by a Pueblo army led by Popé they estimated (or overestimated) to number 2,500. Other Spanish survivors had taken refuge in the friendly Pueblo of Isleta, from where they fled southward.

On August 21 the Spanish broke out of the Palace and began a long trek south, leaving New Mexico behind and not stopping until they reached El Paso. The Pueblos did not molest the departing colonists. The survivors numbered nearly 2,000 persons. The revolt cost 400 Spanish lives, including 21 of the 33 priests in New Mexico.

== Leader of the Pueblo peoples ==
Po'pay had succeeded in expelling the Spanish from New Mexico and according to later accounts, possibly prejudiced, set himself up as the sole ruler of all the Pueblos. He attempted to destroy every trace of the Spanish presence in New Mexico. "The God of the Christians is dead," he proclaimed. "He was made of rotten wood."

A Spanish force of 300 men attempted to regain a foothold in New Mexico in 1681, but was repelled by Po'pay's army. Another Spanish effort in 1687 also failed. But the expulsion of the Spanish had not brought peace and prosperity to the Pueblos. A return to the traditional religion did not bring rain to ease a drought that destroyed crops. The Apaches and Navajo stepped up their raids on the Pueblos and the Indians recalled that the Spaniards had provided some protection from the raiders. Traditional rivalries divided the Pueblo villages. Po'pay's efforts to rule over all the Pueblos were resented and he was considered a tyrant by many Pueblos. Moreover, among the Pueblos were sincere Christians with ties of family and friendship with the Spanish. Opposition to Spanish rule had given the Pueblos the incentive to unite, but not the means to remain united once their common enemy was vanquished.

Po'pay died, probably in 1688, with the united Pueblo state he envisioned divided and weak. In 1692, Governor Diego de Vargas, with an army of 150 Spanish soldiers and pro-Spanish Pueblo warriors, attempted reconquest. Vargas promised pardon rather than punishment and most of the Pueblos gradually acceded to Spanish rule although violent opposition to Spanish rule continued for several years. Only the distant Hopi, living in what is today Arizona, retained their independence although many Pueblos also took up residence among the Navajo and Apaches.

== Legacy ==
As stated by Matthew Martinez of Po'pay's home Pueblo, Ohkay Owingeh, "It took a unique individual to orchestrate the revolt across two dozen communities who spoke six different languages and were sprawled over a distance of nearly 400 miles." What little is known of Po'pay as a person is distorted through the lenses of the Spanish chroniclers and their Indian informants, most of whom were opposed to Po'Pay.

Both the Spanish and the Pueblos were decimated by the revolt and its aftermath. However, what can be said with certainty is that the relations between Spanish and the Pueblos were far different after the revolt than before. The dreaded encomienda system (forced labor) was prohibited in New Mexico. Franciscan priests did not interfere with Pueblo religious ceremonies provided that the Pueblos observed the outward forms of Catholicism. Pueblo warriors and Spanish soldiers became allies in the fight against their common enemies: the Apaches, Navajo, Utes, and a new and even greater threat to the survival of New Mexico, the Comanche. Thus, New Mexico became a blend of Spanish and Pueblo culture.

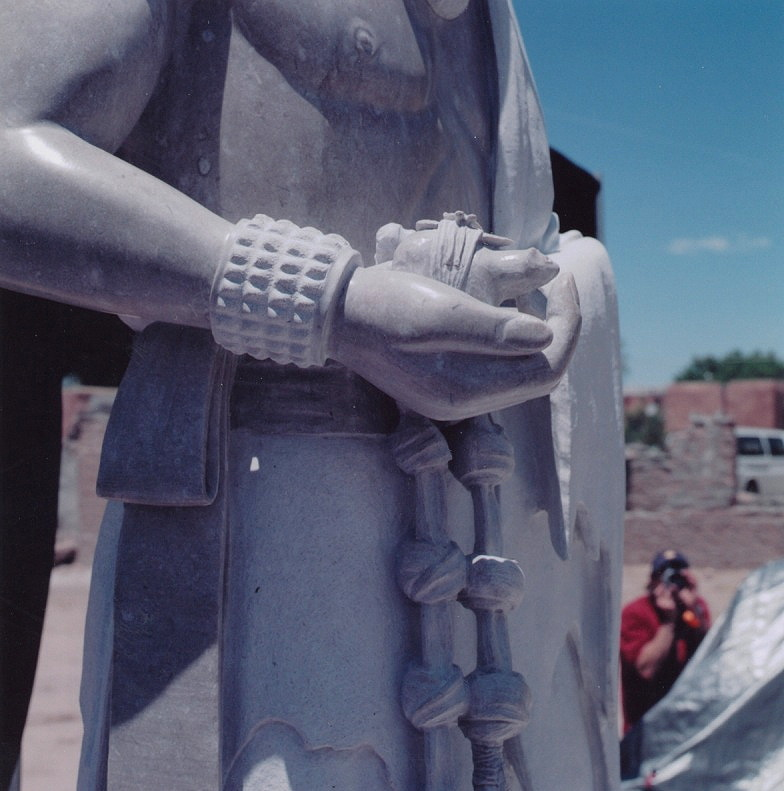
Bear fetish & knotted cord

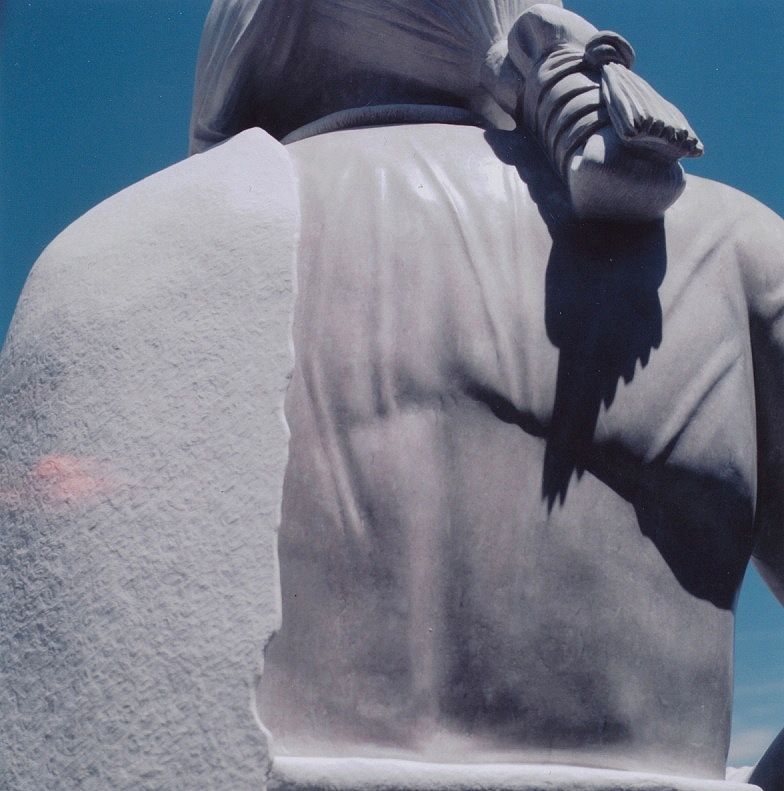
scars on back

On September 22, 2005, the Po'pay statue for the National Statuary Hall in the rotunda of the U.S. Congress building was unveiled. The artist, Cliff Fragua, was the first American Indian artist to have a statue placed in the Statuary Hall. The statue, slightly larger than life size, shows Po'Pay holding a knotted cord in his left hand, the signal for the initiation of the revolt. In his right hand is a bear fetish and behind him a pot, both symbolizing the Pueblo world and religion. On his back are the scars from the whipping he received as a consequence of his observing Pueblo religious ceremonies. Herman Agoyo of Ohkay Owingeh said: "To the Pueblo people here, Po'pay is our hero. Tribes were on the verge of losing their cultural identity when the Pueblo revolt brought everything back on track for our people." It is one of two statues presented by New Mexico to the National Statuary Hall Collection. It is currently displayed in the Capitol Visitors' Center.

In fiction, Po'pay is mentioned by the controversial Taos Catholic priest Antonio José Martínez in Willa Cather's Death Comes for the Archbishop, as leader of the Indian revolt which "so added to Spanish martyrology." Popé is also the name of the New Mexico 'savage' in Huxley's dystopian novel Brave New World in which he is known to hold on to traditional beliefs.
