= Holston Formation =

Stratigraphic unit containing Tennessee marble in US

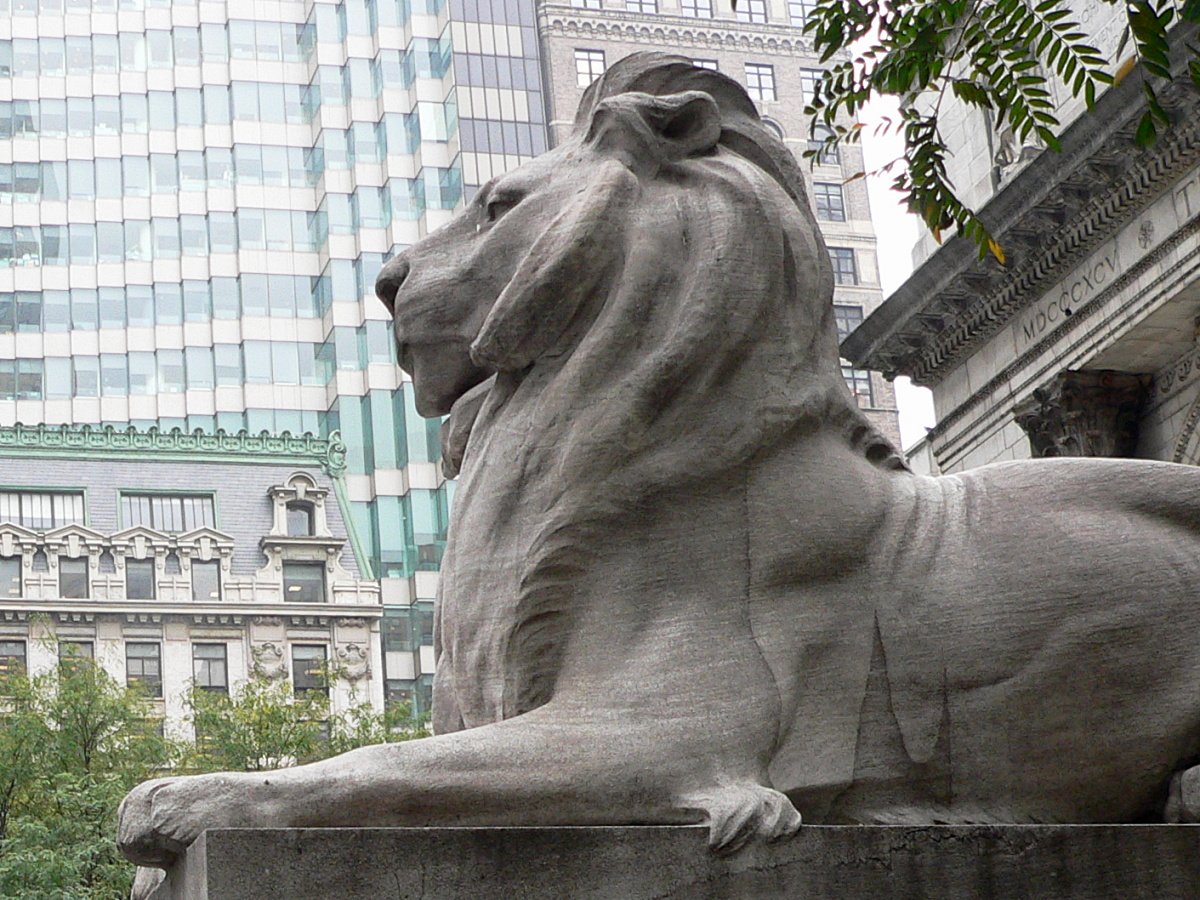
Fortitude (1916), one of the pair of famous lion statues at the New York Public Library which are carved of pink Tennessee marble of the Holston Formation.

The Holston Formation, alternately known as the Holston Limestone, is a stratigraphic unit of Ordovician age within the Chickamauga Group in the Ridge-and-Valley physiographic province of the southeastern United States. A 120-mile (190 km) long outcrop belt of the Holston in East Tennessee is the source of the decorative building stone known as Tennessee marble.

Near Knoxville the Holston Formation is about 400 feet (120 m) thick but it thins toward the southwest; near Cleveland, Tennessee it is only 200 feet thick. The rock that is quarried for marble is a highly pure (97% CaCO_{3}) crystalline limestone, pink to cedar-red in color.

== Use in building and sculpture ==
Two notable buildings in Washington, D.C. use Tennessee marble: the National Gallery of Art, which uses stone from Knox and Blount counties, and the United States Capitol, which has stairways constructed from Hawkins County marble.
