= Washington apples =

American agricultural crop

Washington apples are an important agricultural crop in the U.S. state of Washington as well as a symbol of the state itself. Washington is the leading U.S. producer of apples and one of the leading exporters in the world, producing 60% of the U.S. crop in 2022.

== History ==
=== Pioneer and other early orchards ===
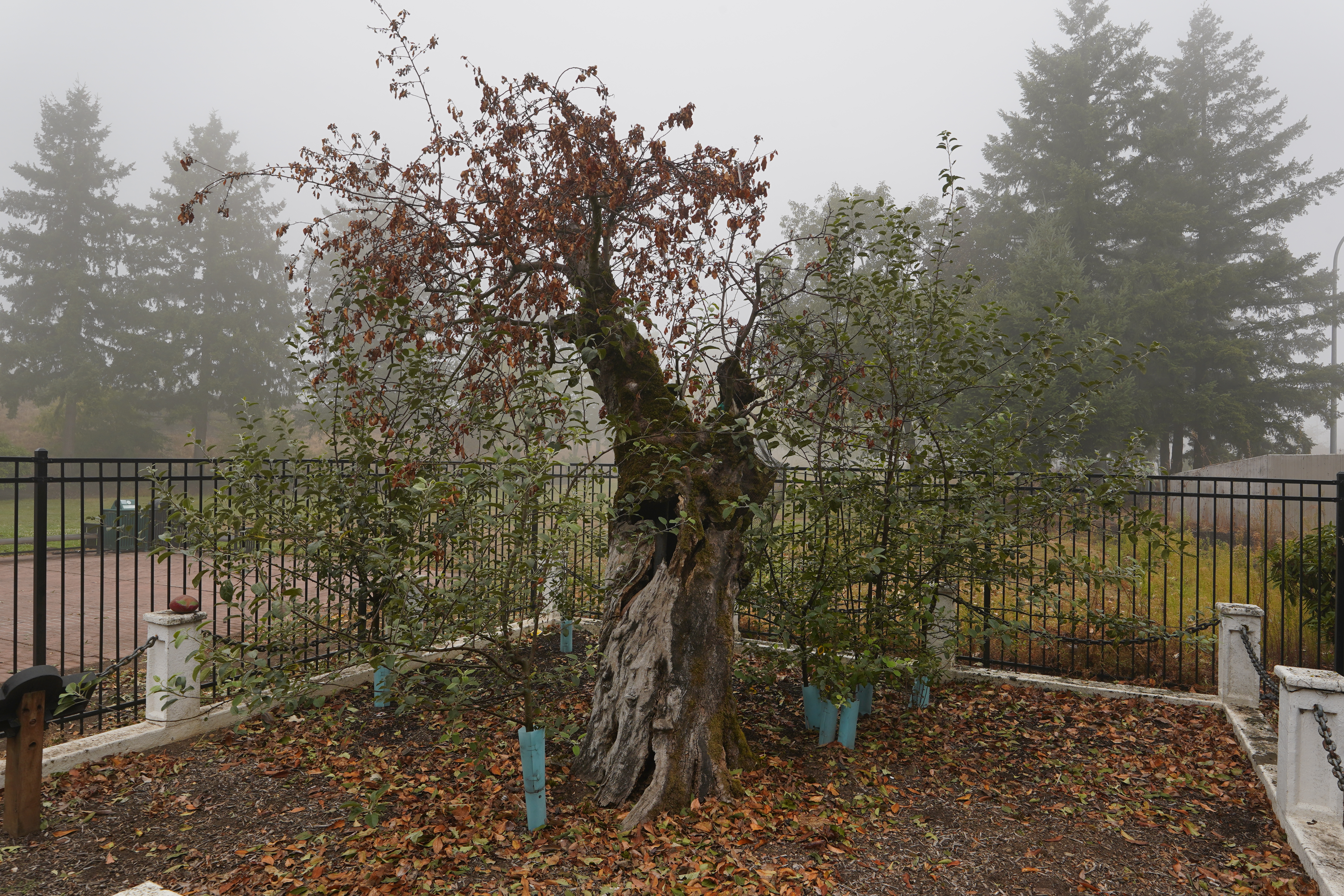
Old Apple Tree in Vancouver's Old Apple Tree Park, one of the first apple trees planted in the state, shortly after the trunk died at 194 years of age

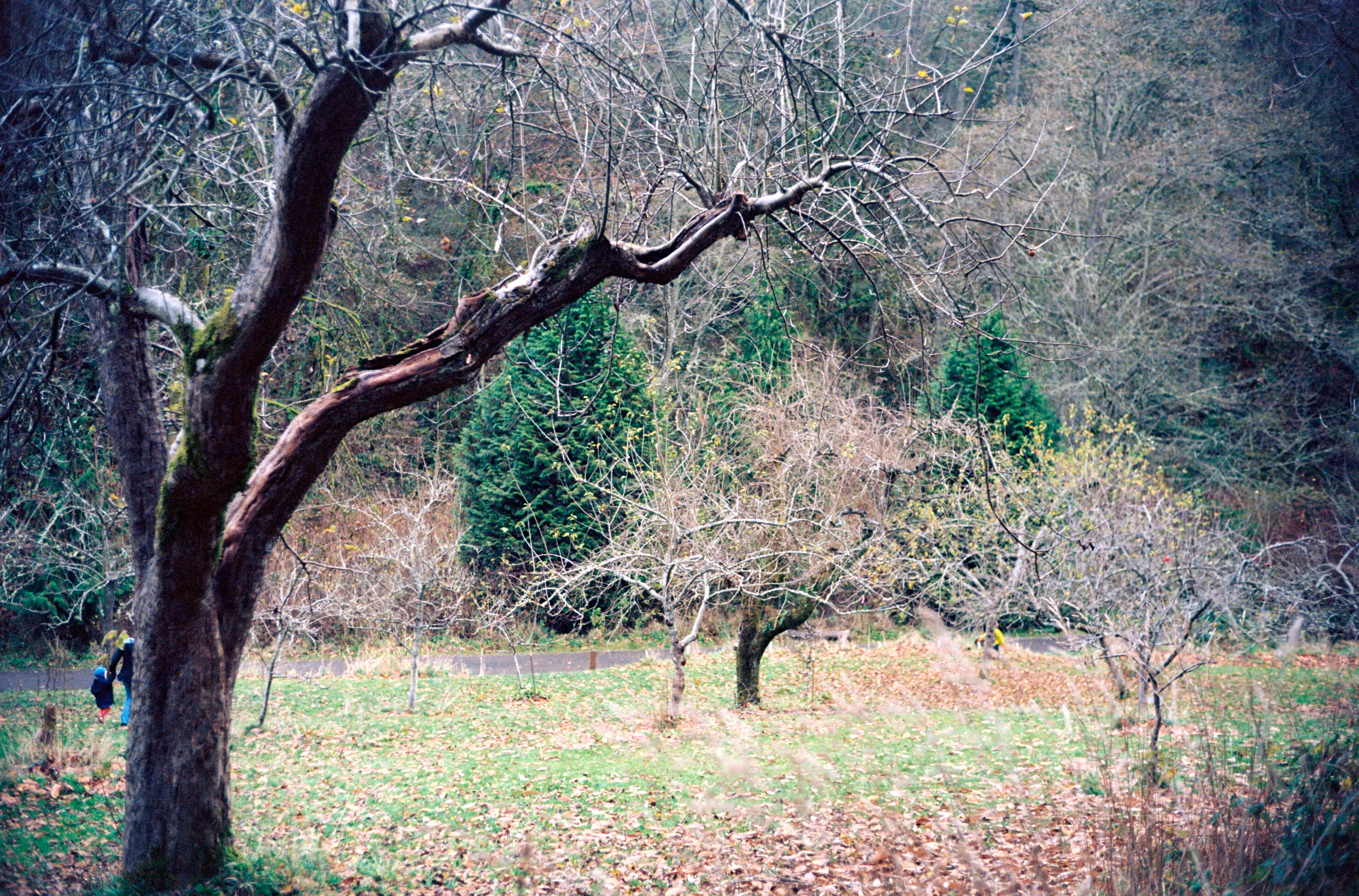
Piper Orchard, Seattle, planted c. 1890

The first apple tree in Washington may have been planted at Fort Vancouver between 1827 and 1829, and one of the five original trees was designated a heritage tree by the City of Vancouver, Washington and surrounded by a park created in 1984, Old Apple Tree Park. The main trunk of the tree died in 2020 but one of its root suckers was designated as a replacement heritage tree. The Piper Orchard, planted around 1890 by an early Seattle pioneer, stands in Seattle and the original trees still produce fruit in the 21st century. Another orchard from around the same time stands near Steptoe Butte in Eastern Washington.

=== Early agriculture ===
Before large scale irrigation in Eastern Washington, San Juan County was the state's most important apple production region.

Significant early pests were the codling moth and San Jose scale.

=== 20th century ===
The state has led the U.S. in apple production since the 1920s. Two Eastern Washington areas account for the vast majority of the state's apple crop: the Wenatchee–Okanogan region (comprising Chelan, Okanogan, Douglas, and Grant counties), and the Yakima region (Yakima, Benton and Kittitas counties). The industry was developed by the railroads with the Northern Pacific Railway controlling the Yakima valley and the Great Northern Railway controlling the Wenatchee valley. Commercial apple farming was made possible by district irrigation projects.

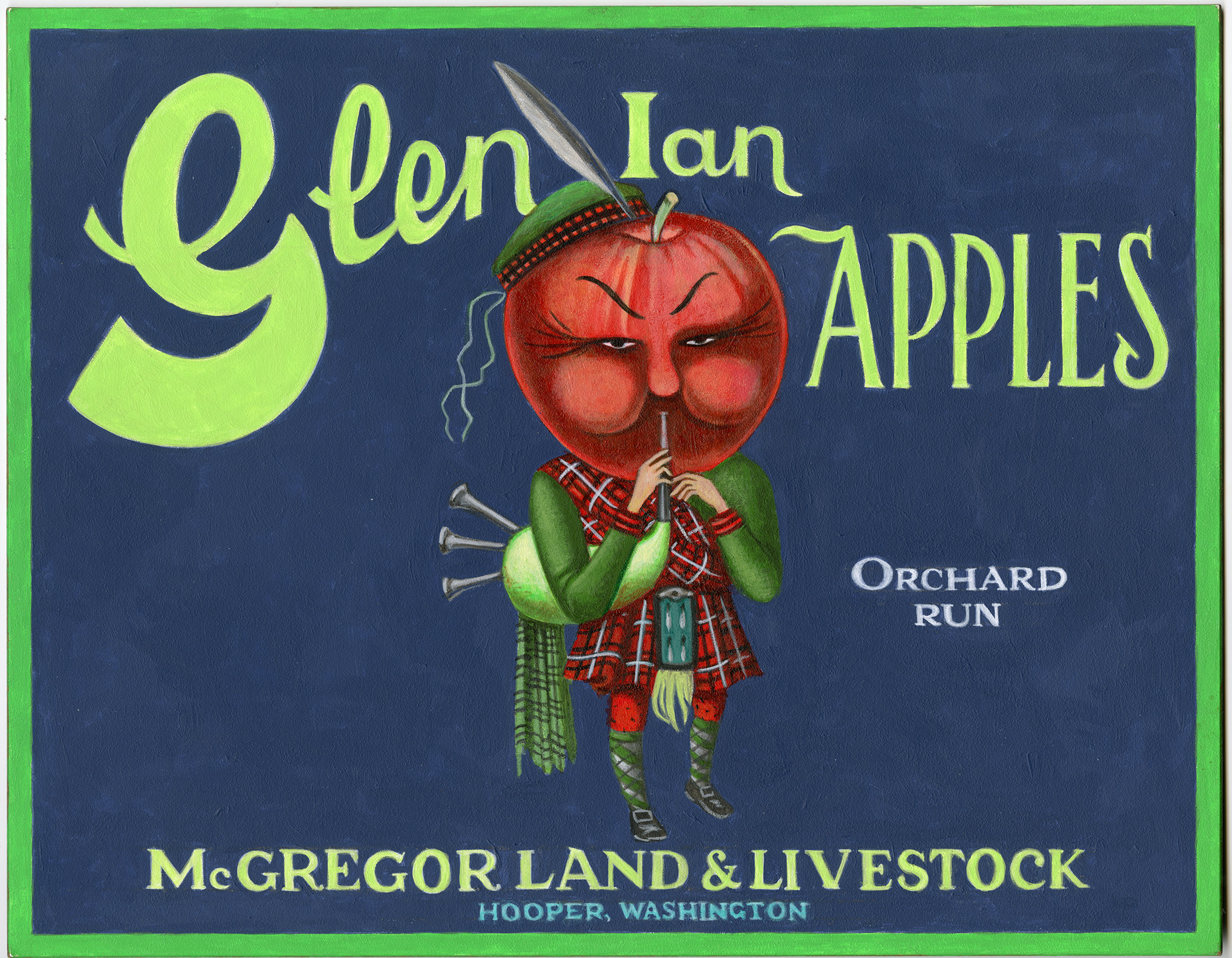
Apple box label used in first half of the 20th century

Apple boxes were used to preserve fruit quality during transportation, and Wenatchee emerged as a production center. Colorful box labels were used for marketing by the second decade of the 20th century.

The apple industry in the Pacific Northwest distinguished itself from traditional apple growing regions in the east of the country by focusing on the quality of apples delivered to the market rather than the quantity. As a result of this growers in Washington delivered their apples to market packing in boxes as opposed to the barrels used by most established growers.

The Great Depression hurt the industry greatly as widespread economic disruption caused consumers in market cities to decrease consumption. World War II saw most of the Washington apple industry's apples diverted to the war effort with only apples of secondary quality and culls left for the domestic market. This significantly hurt the reputation Washington's apple industry as apples of secondary quality and culls had not been sold on the domestic fresh fruit market before. Improvements and innovation in packaging technology during the war allowed apples to last longer in transit. The rise in commercial trucking after the war radically altered the industry as growers and packers were no longer dependent on the railroads to reach distant markets. Since World War II there has been a trend of consolidation in the industry.

=== As a state symbol ===
"The Washington apple is certainly one of the most recognized symbols of the state worldwide", according to the Washington State Legislature.

== Pests ==
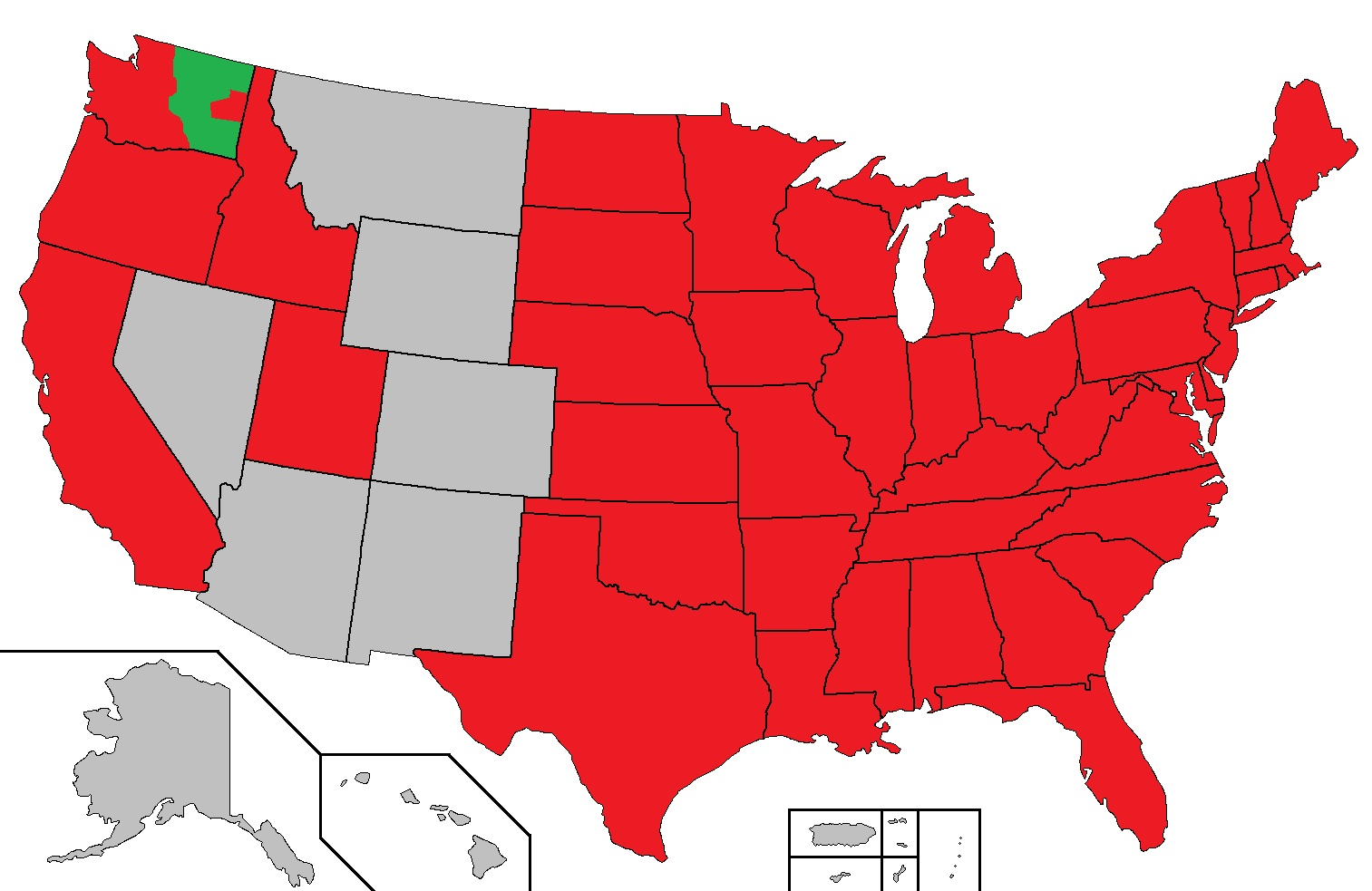
Apple Maggot Quarantine Area is virtually all arable areas of the United States outside of Eastern Washington (green), the state's major apple production zone.

Botrytis cinerea is a major apple disease in Washington. SDHIs are commonly used, especially boscalid, which has produced a resistance problem. Yin et al., 2011 provides a molecular diagnostic for a particularly common succinate dehydrogenase (SDH) mutation. Using their own test they also noticed that SDH alone did not entirely determine SDHI resistance, indicating that other factors than the exact nucleotide sequence of this one enzyme are involved in the resistance problem.

Apple maggots are such a problem that the state has erected the Apple Maggot Quarantine Area between the west and the east.

== 21st century production ==
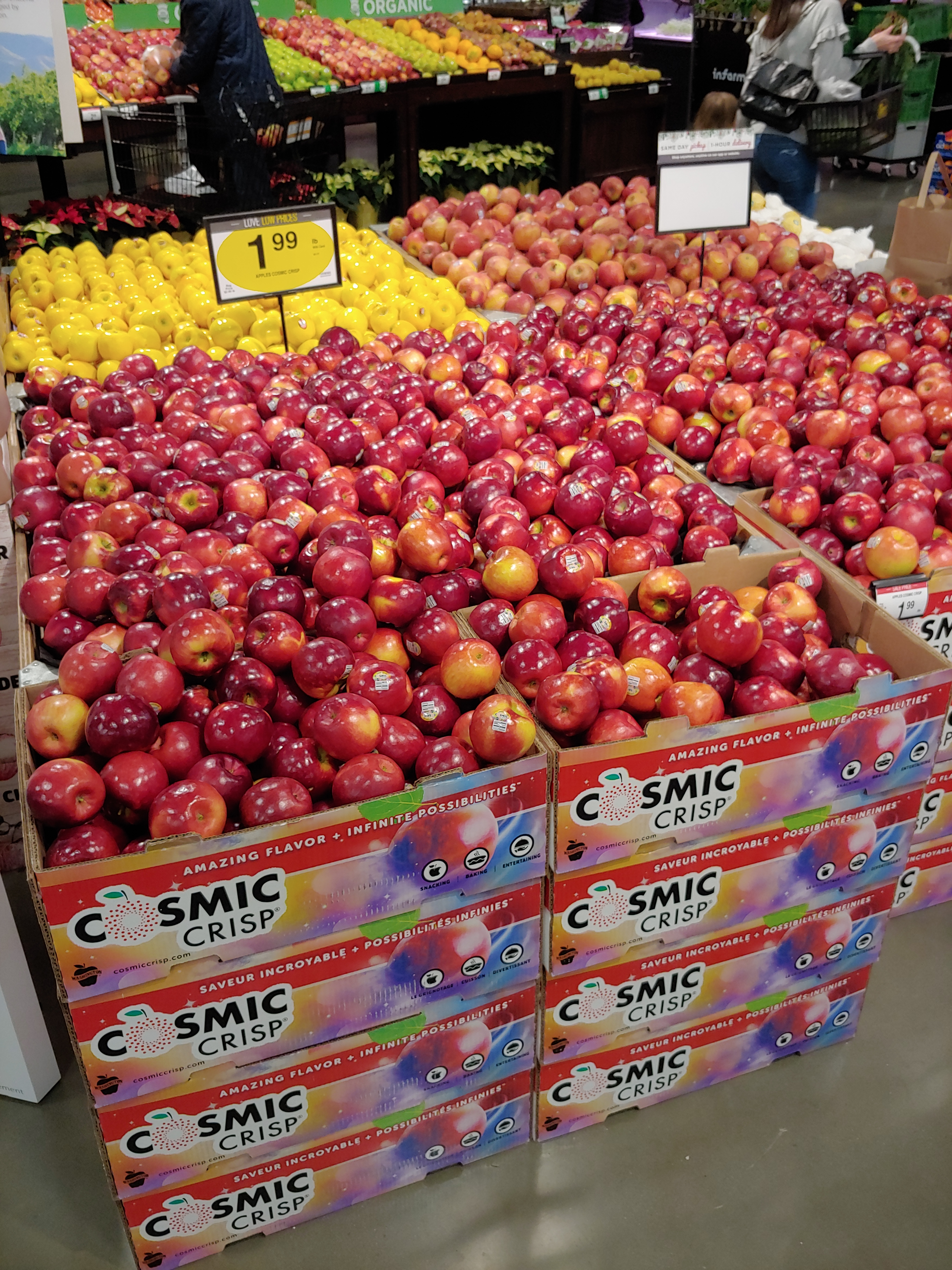
Cosmic Crisp is a 21st century apple variety first created, then grown exclusively in Washington

The 2022 crop was worth over 2 billion dollars.

The Washington Apple Commission regulates the industry.

New varieties were developed in the 21st century in Washington state, including Cosmic Crisp and Sunflare. Other new varieties developed elsewhere but grown in large acreage in Washington include Arctic Apples and SweeTango.

== See also ==
- Lost Apple Project (Whitman County, Washington)
- Washington State Apple Blossom Festival

== Gallery ==
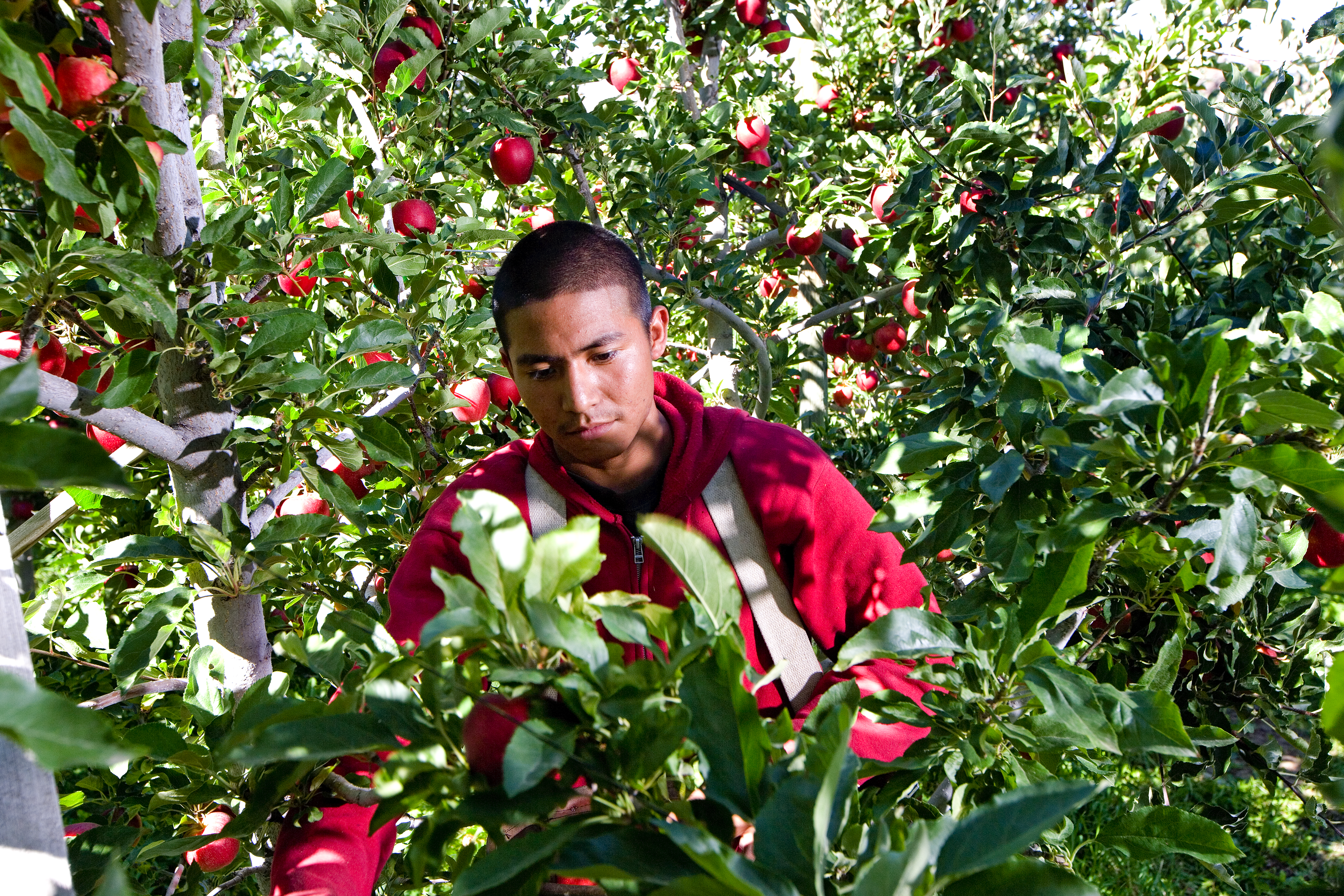
Ripe apples picked and bagged at an orchard (South-central Washington)

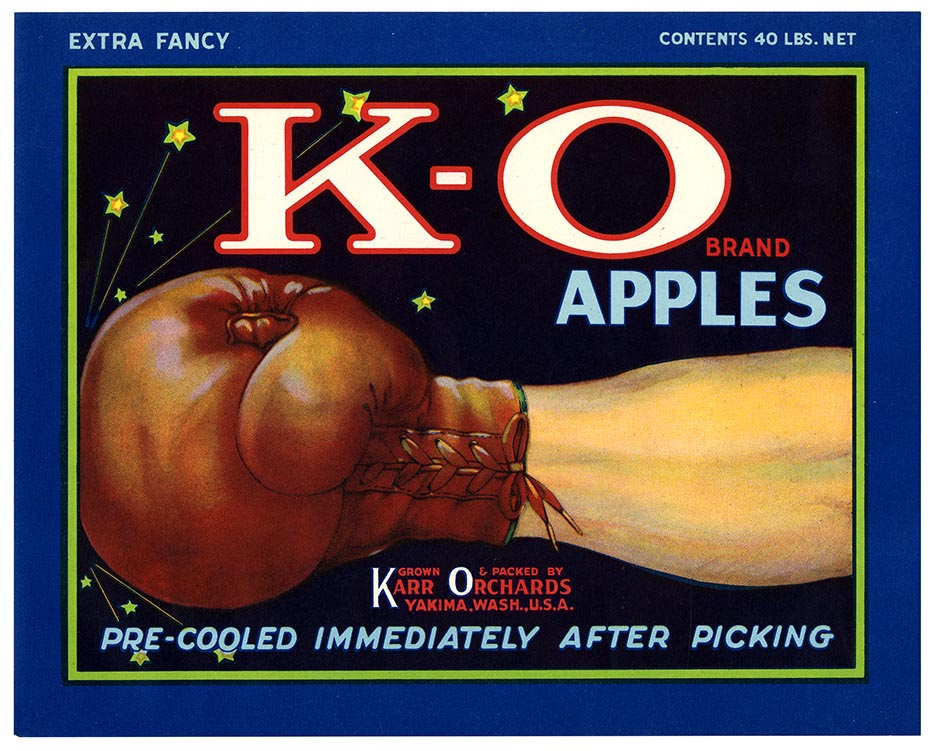
Colorful labels were used for marketing on Washington apple crates.

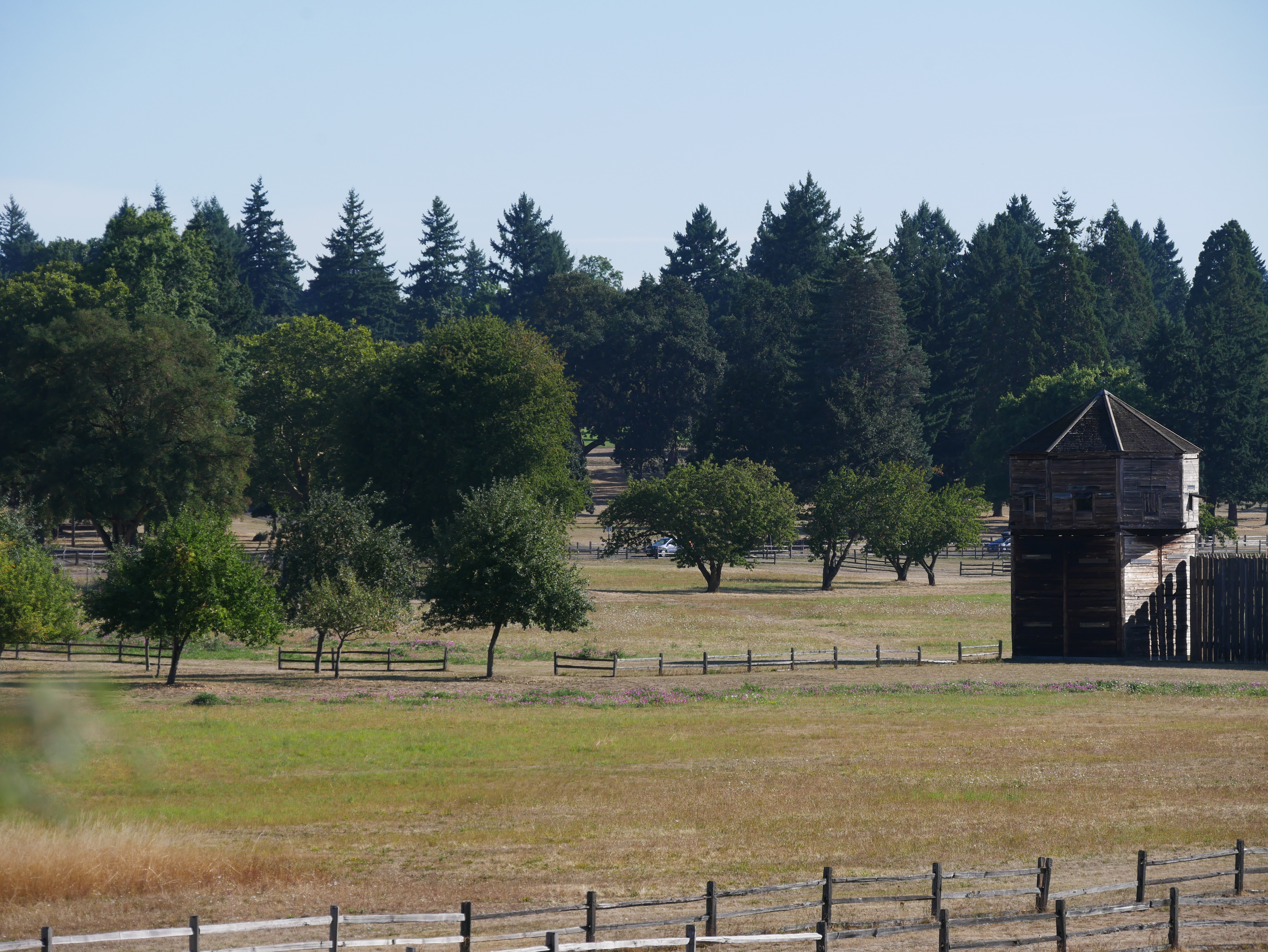
Reconstructed orchard at Fort Vancouver, original planted 1827–1829

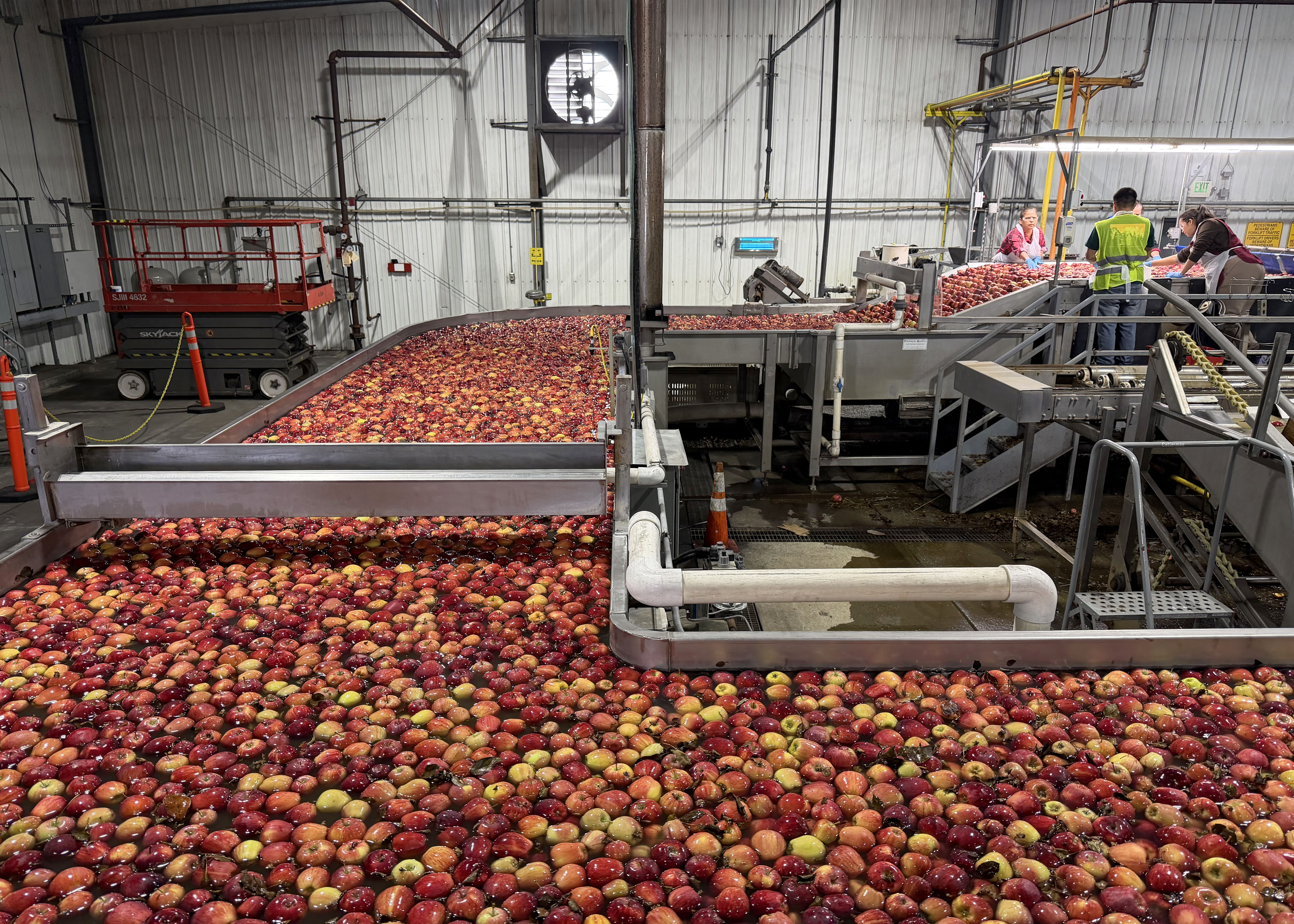
Interior of an apple packing facility in Wapato
