= Dana Lyons =

American musician

- Born: Kingston, New York, U.S.
- Occupations: Musician, author

Dana Lyons is an American folk and alternative rock musician, who wrote and performed the 1996 comedic folk song "Cows With Guns". “Cows With Guns” was #1 for the year on Dr. Demento, #2 on the Australian Country charts, #1 in Seattle and spent six months on the Irish Top 40.

== Biography ==
Lyons' environmentalist song "Our State Is a Dumpsite", composed and performed with his younger brother Zach Lyons, was proposed in the Washington state legislature in 1986 as the official state song.

Dana Lyons went on to perform music for the environmental group Earth First!.

Lyons is the author of the children's book The Tree (2002). Jane Goodall wrote the foreword and David Danioth provided the illustrations.

== Early life and education ==
Dana Lyons was born in Kingston, New York. He is a graduate of Swarthmore College. Lyons lives in Bellingham, Washington.

== Discography ==
- Cows with Guns (1997) – No. 32 album Australia

== Bibliography ==
- Cows with Guns illustrated by Jeff Sinclair, 1998 ISBN 978-0-670-87890-1
- The Tree illustrated by David Danioth, 2002 ISBN 978-0-9701907-3-4
