= California Border Protection Stations =

Checkpoints along California land borders with other states

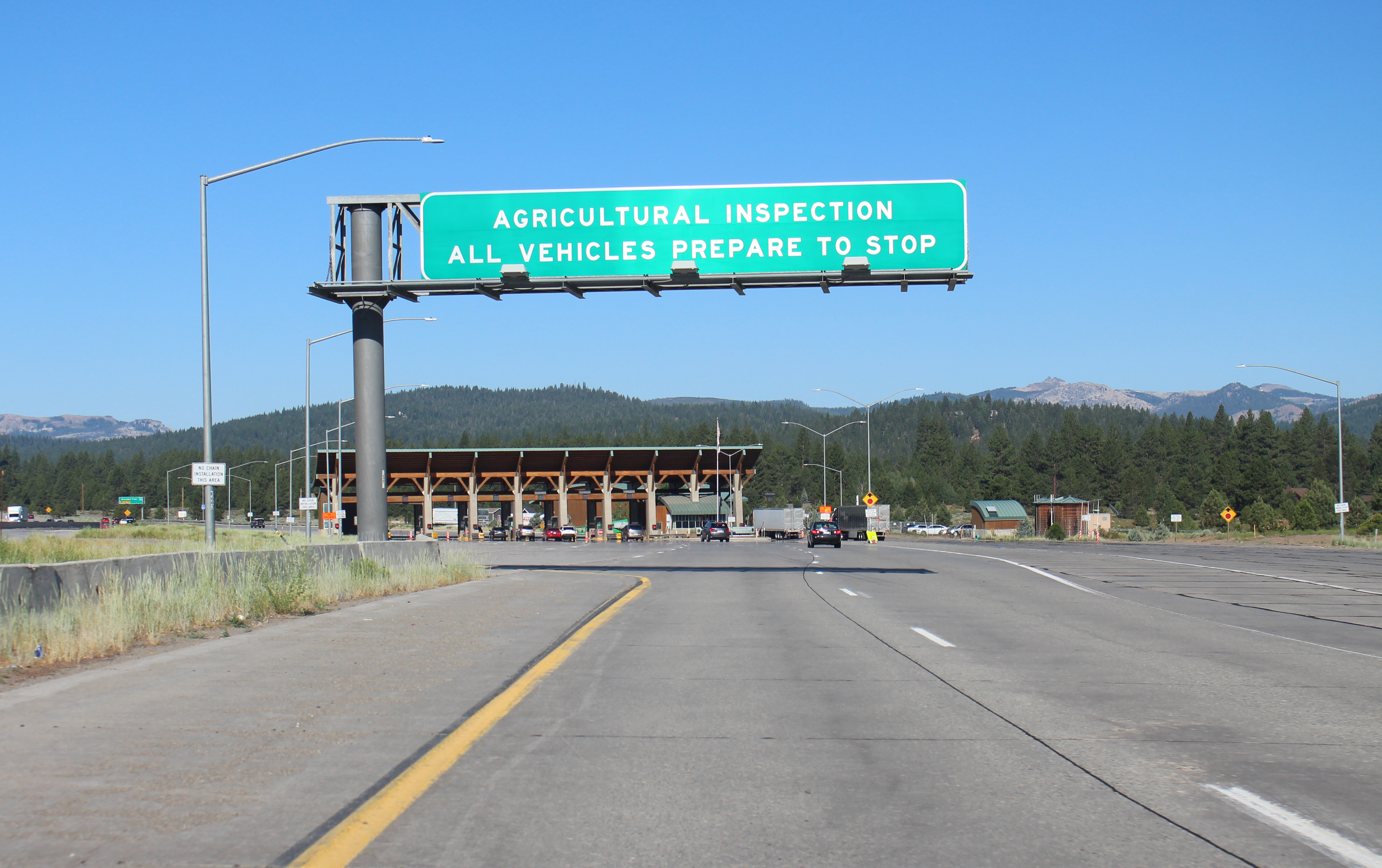
A California Border Protection Station on Interstate 80 at Truckee, photographed in 2021.

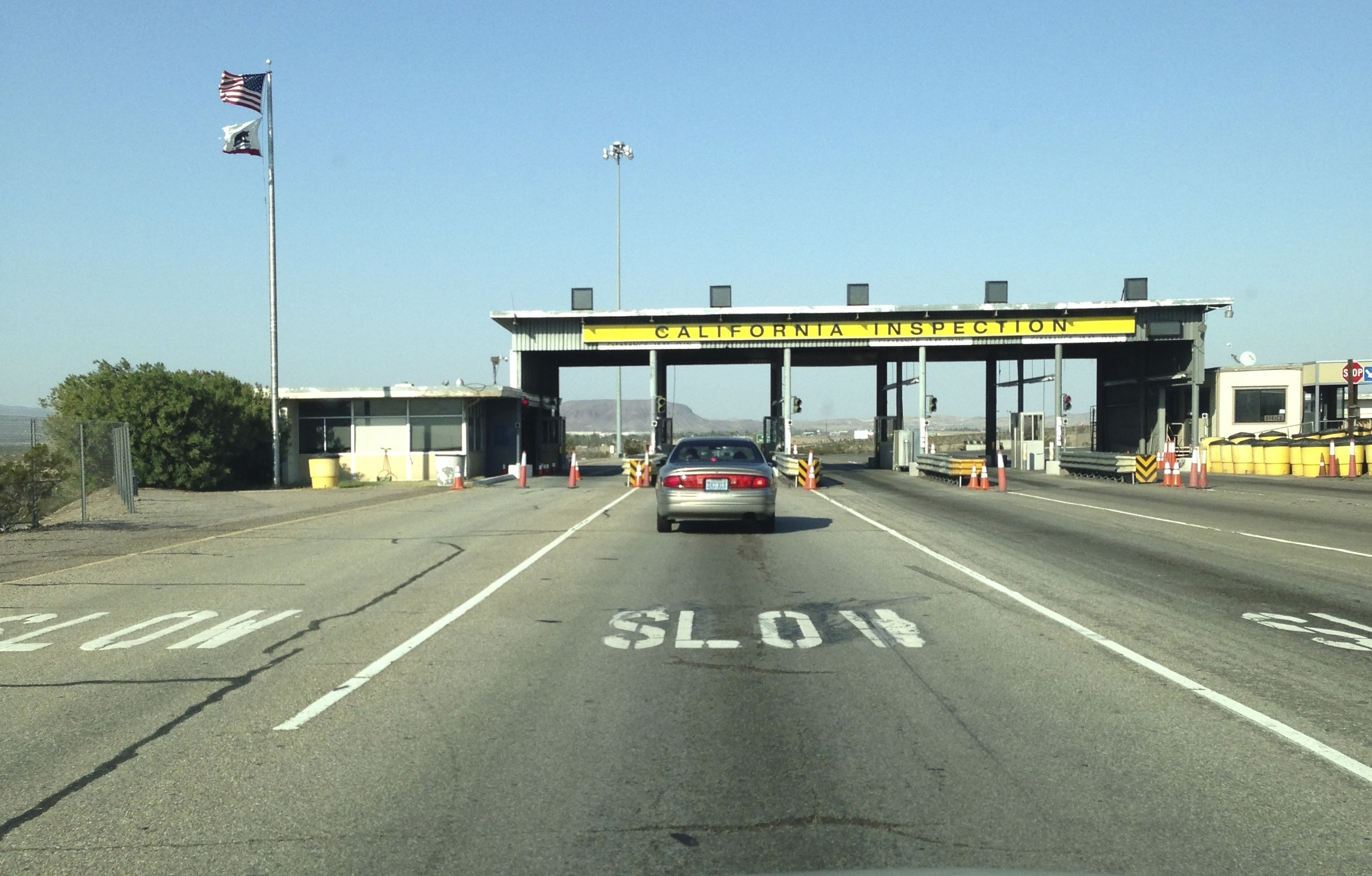
A California Border Protection Station on Interstate 15 at Yermo, circa 2013. After a newer station was built, this station was demolished in 2018.

California Border Protection Stations (CBPS) are 16 checkpoints maintained by the California Department of Food and Agriculture along the state's land borders with Oregon, Nevada, and Arizona. Officials staffing CBPS checkpoints inspect vehicle traffic entering California for the presence of pests; vehicles discovered to be carrying infested cargo are denied entry to the state.

== History ==
=== Background ===
The first highway agricultural pest inspection stations were established in 1921 on highways that cross the state borders with Nevada in the High Sierras near Reno after the destructive alfalfa weevil were detected in several campgrounds along the highways coming from Nevada. During the first year of operation, the inspection stations found live alfalfa weevils inside camping equipment. The following year, similar inspection stations were placed in operation on the three principal highways leading into Southern California from the eastern and southern United States to detect pests from cotton and citrus-growing southern states. By 1986, twenty-three border quarantine stations were being operated by the State Department of Agriculture which inspected a half-million cars that year.

As of 2017, approximately 13 percent of United States agriculture production occurred in California, with agribusiness directly generating $47.1 billion of economic activity in the state. The California Department of Food and Agriculture (CDFA) is a state government agency with a primary mandate of protecting California "against invasion of exotic pests and diseases".

California Border Protection Stations are 16 checkpoints placed at California's land borders with neighboring states and maintained by the CDFA for the purpose of monitoring vehicle traffic entering the state for the presence of cargo infested with pests. As of 2017, an average of 27 million vehicles were stopped and inspected annually by CBPS staff.

=== Development ===
Border Protection Stations were first established by California in 1920. A 1968 plan to close the stations and replace them with six regional inspection hubs in the interior of the state was ultimately scuttled after opposition to the proposal was mounted by county agriculture officials. Beginning in 1970, inspectors were issued blue uniforms to, according to the Sacramento Bee, "help present a 'Welcome to California' image".

=== Efficacy ===
According to the California Department of Food and Agriculture, every dollar spent on maintaining the CBPSes saves $14 in economic losses that would be incurred by the introduction of pests.

== Legality ==
=== Inspection of vehicles ===
In the 1980 case of People v. Dickinson, in which a motorist was arrested after 200 pounds (91 kg) of marijuana was discovered in his vehicle at a California Border Protection Station, the California Court of Appeal ruled that "quarantine officers may stop motorists at the inspection stations and request to look into the trunk of the vehicle. This is in accord with United States v. Ortiz and United States v. Martinez-Fuerte. If the motorist voluntarily opens the trunk of the vehicle, the quarantine officer may look therein and, as here, remove any plant materials in plain view for further inspection".

=== Regulation of interstate commerce ===
In the 1986 case Maine v. Taylor, the U.S. Supreme Court ruled that a state can – through statute law – regulate interstate commerce in order to serve "a legitimate local purpose that could not adequately be served by available nondiscriminatory alternatives" that would otherwise comply with the Commerce Clause of the U.S. Constitution.

== Procedures ==
Vehicles entering California from Oregon, Nevada, or Arizona, are profiled at CBPS checkpoints to assess their potential risk. Passenger vehicles with California license plates, or those of bordering states, are considered low risk and are generally subject to only a cursory screening which consists of an inspector asking the vehicle's driver questions about the contents of their vehicle. Other vehicles – particularly recreational vehicles, commercial trucks, or those carrying watercraft or livestock – are considered higher risk and may be subject to a visual inspection of cargo and contents. During the 2016–2017 fiscal year, one CBPS in Yermo denied entry to California to 882 cross-border shipments.

In addition, apiary cargo is logged by inspectors and the driver required to declare a final destination in California. Logs of such shipments are then forwarded to the agricultural office of the destination county so that a more thorough inspection of the cargo can be made upon its arrival.

The agricultural inspectors cannot make arrests if they stumble into illegal non-agricultural material, such as cocaine or undocumented migrants, but can detain individuals until California Highway Patrol or Border Patrol officers arrive.

== List of stations ==
- US 101 south – Smith River
- US 199 south – Redwood (near O'Brien, Oregon)
- I-5 south – Hornbrook
- US 97 south – Dorris
- SR 139 south – Tulelake
- US 395 south / SR 299 west – Alturas
- US 395 north – Long Valley (near Chilcoot)
- I-80 west – Truckee
- US 50 west / SR 89 south – Meyers
- US 395 south – Topaz
- US 6 west – Benton
- I-15 south – Mountain Pass
- I-40 west – Needles
- SR 62 west – Vidal
- I-10 west / US 95 north – Blythe
- I-8 west – Winterhaven

== Other checkpoints in California ==
In addition to state-maintained CBPS checkpoints, the United States Department of Homeland Security maintains 20 United States Border Patrol interior checkpoints at California's airports and seaports, and that portion of the Mexico–United States border contiguous with California's southern frontier.

== See also ==
- Apple Maggot Quarantine Area
- Plant Protection and Quarantine
