= List of Washington state symbols =

The flag of Washington, the state's flag

The U.S. state of Washington has 21 official emblems, as designated by the Washington State Legislature. These symbols, which reflect the history and culture of the state, are often opportunities for politicians to "tie themselves to popular symbols", for teachers to highlight the legislative process to their students, and for lobbyists to "have their products given official designation".

While some of the symbols are unique to Washington, others are used by multiple states. For example, the willow goldfinch (also known as the American goldfinch), Washington's state bird, is also an official symbol for Iowa and New Jersey. Washington's state grass, bluebunch wheatgrass, is also a symbol for the state of Montana. The square dance and apple are commonly used state dances and state foods, respectively. While most states have an official motto and nickname, Washington's motto ("Al-ki", meaning "by and by" in Chinook Jargon) and nickname ("The Evergreen State") have never been officially adopted by the Legislature.

Washington's first official symbol was its flag, adopted in 1923. While some symbols, including the state flower and state seal, were selected before then, they were not adopted by the Legislature until later. Washington's second symbol was the western hemlock, selected as the state tree in 1947. Fourteen symbols were added between 1950 and 2000. Five symbols have been adopted in the 21st century. The newest symbol of Washington is state dinosaur, "Suciasaurus rex", which was declared in 2023.

== Insignia ==
Type	Symbol	Description	Adopted	Image
Flag	Flag of Washington	The Legislature adopted the state flag in 1923, more than thirty years after the state was admitted to the United States. By law (RCW 1.20.010), the flag "shall be of dark green silk or bunting and shall bear in its center a reproduction of the seal of the state of Washington embroidered, printed, painted or stamped thereon. The edges of the flag may, or may not, be fringed. If a fringe is used the same shall be of gold or yellow color of the same shade as the seal. The dimensions of the flag may vary."	1923	A green flag with a circular seal consisting of concentric circles. The inner circles contains an image of a stately man wearing a powdered wig. The outer circle has the words "The Seal of the State of Washington" and "1889" written clockwise within a yellow banner surrounding the inner circle.
Seal	Seal of Washington	Originally designed by Charles Talcott shortly before Washington was admitted to the United States in 1889, the seal contains the image of George Washington encircled with "The Seal of the State of Washington" and the date "1889". The simple design was accepted by the Legislature, but did not become the official seal until graphic designer Richard Nelms was commissioned to create a new insignia. Nelms used a portrait by painter Gilbert Stuart in his design, which was accepted by the Legislature in 1967.	1967	A circular seal that contains the image of George Washington with a light blue background, along with "The Seal of the State of Washington" and "1889" written clockwise within a yellow banner surrounding Washington.

== Species ==
Type	Symbol	Description	Adopted	Image
Amphibian	Pacific chorus frog (Pseudacris regilla)	Native to the Pacific Northwest, the Pacific Chorus Frog was designated as the state amphibian because it lives on both sides of the Cascade Range and within each county of the state. The symbol was proposed by third graders at Boston Harbor Grade School in north Olympia.	2007	A light green and tan colored frog with a black stripe extending from its nose, across its eye, to its shoulder, set in light brown sand
Bird	Willow goldfinch (Spinus tristis salicamans)	In 1928, school children selected the meadowlark as the state bird, the same choice made by seven other states at the time. The Washington Federation of Women's Clubs picked the goldfinch as the state symbol in 1931 over the tanager, song sparrow, junco and pileated woodpecker. Two decades later, legislators allowed school children to decide between the two birds, and the goldfinch was chosen.	1951	A yellow bird with black coloring on its wings and head, with an orange beak and white striations on its wings, perching on a wood branch
Dinosaur	"Suciasaurus rex"	The specimen, the state's first dinosaur fossil, was of a theropod discovered in 2012 and selected as a state symbol based on the advocacy of school students.	2023	Femur of "Suciasaurus rex"
Endemic mammal	Olympic marmot (Marmota olympus)	One of the only endemic mammals in Washington, the highly social Olympic marmot can be found throughout the Olympic Peninsula and are easy to spot during the summer months along Hurricane Ridge in Olympic National Park. To promote awareness of the animal, the Legislature adopted the state endemic mammal in 2009.	2009	A brown, furry animal with black eyes and light coloring around the nose and mouth set in brown dirt and green grass.
Fish	Steelhead trout (Oncorhynchus mykiss)	Adopted as the state fish in 1969, the steelhead is one of the most popular fish for recreational fishing in Washington. While the Legislature used an old scientific name Salmo gairdnerii to describe the fish, two subspecies of rainbow trout are anadromous and known as steelhead—Columbia River redband trout O. m. gairdneri and coastal rainbow trout O. m. irideus.	1969	Illustration of a silvery fish.
Flower	Pacific rhododendron (Rhododendron macrophyllum)	Before suffrage, Washington women selected the coast rhododendron as the state flower in 1892. Six flowers were initially considered as an entry for a floral exhibit at the 1893 World's Columbian Exposition, but the rhododendron beat out the clover following a statewide election. In 1959, the lawmakers officially designated the native species Rhododendron macrophyllum as the state flower. In Frasier, the title character attests that the state's flower is mildew.	1959	Two clusters of pink flowers emerging from broad green leaves; various other green plants and brown branches are in the background.
Fruit	Apple (Malus domestica)	In 1989, Rep. Clyde Ballard proposed a bill that would designate the apple as Washington's state fruit and require that they appear on new license plates. Washington apples, especially the commercial orchards of Eastern Washington, represent one of the state's largest industries and led the nation in apple production.	1989	A round, red apple and its cross section side-by-side and isolated on a white background. A brown seed is set in the center of the cross sectioned apple.
Grass	Bluebunch wheatgrass (Agropyron spicatum)	Native to Eastern Washington, bluebunch wheatgrass supports the cattle and livestock industry and was designated as the state grass in 1989.	1989	A thick stock of grass with several seed pods on either side of the stock
Insect	Green darner dragonfly (Anax junius)	The common green darner dragonfly was designated as the state insect in 1997 following a proposal by students at Crestwood Elementary School in Kent and the support of children in more than 100 school districts statewide. This dragonfly species can be found throughout Washington and is a "beneficial contributor to the ecosystem because it consumes a large number of insect pests."	1997	A light green dragonfly with its wings spread, holding onto a brown branch. Green foliage are a blue sky are seen in the background.
Marine mammal	Orca (Orcinus orca)	Following a proposal submitted by students at Crescent Harbor Elementary in Oak Harbor, the Legislature adopted the orca as the state marine mammal in 2005 since it attracts many tourists, is a significant symbol for the Native American culture, and pods of the whales migrate through Puget Sound each year. The designation is also intended to promote awareness of the whale and encourage protection of the marine environment.	2005	Two black and white whales jumping out of blue water, with the left side of the forefront and the underside of the background whale showing.
Oyster	Olympia oyster (Ostrea lurida)	The Olympia oyster is the only oyster native to Washington.	2014	
Tree	Western hemlock (Tsuga heterophylla)	In 1946, The Portland Oregonian teased Washington for not having a state tree, suggesting the western hemlock for its neighbor. Washington newspapers preferred the popular western red cedar, but state representative George Adams insisted on the western hemlock, claiming the species would become "the backbone of [the] state's forest industry". Adams' bill passed the Legislature and became law in 1947.	1947	A green tree with numerous needle-like leaves. Other trees appear in the background, as does a clear blue sky.
Vegetable	Walla Walla sweet onion (Allium cepa)	Originally from the island of Corsica, a sweet onion seed was brought to Walla Walla by a French soldier more than a century ago. Well-suited for the climate offered by southeastern Washington, many Walla Walla Valley farmers continue to grow the onions today. The onion was designated as the state vegetable due to the persistence of students at Eatonville Middle School and Kirkland Junior High School.	2007	A pile of onions, with green stems protruding from white bulbs. Organes, lemons and limes are visible in the background.

== Geology ==
Type	Symbol	Description	Adopted	Image
Fossil	Columbian mammoth (Mammuthus columbi)	The Legislature designated the Columbian mammoth as the state fossil in 1998, following a four-year effort by students at Windsor Elementary School near Cheney. During the Pleistocene, the prehistoric elephants roamed throughout the United States, including the Pacific Northwest. These fossils were discovered on the Olympic Peninsula.	1998	A reconstructed skeleton shaped like an elephant, set within a round exhibit and supported by cables from the ceiling. Lights shine down onto the skeleton, and a woman is viewing a colorful collage against a wall in the background.
Gem	Petrified wood	Petrified wood, formed when water permeates wood and replaces the fiber with silica, can be found in almost every county of the state in a variety of tree species, "some extinct and some exquisite". Petrified wood was discovered in Vantage in the early 1930s, which led to the creation of the Ginkgo Petrified Forest State Park as a national historic preserve. Other sites with petrified wood include the Umtanum Petrified Forest and the Saddle Mountain Petrified Forest.	1975	A polished slice of a petrified tree, which contains numerous cracks and shades of black, grey, white, orange and yellow.
Waterfall	Palouse Falls	198-foot waterfall created by ice age floods.	2014	

== Culture ==
Type	Symbol	Description	Adopted	Image
Arboretum	Washington Park Arboretum	Managed by Seattle and the University of Washington, the arboretum is a "living museum" that encourages conservation and displays plants from around the world that can grow in the Pacific Northwest. The arboretum is the "oldest center for botanical and gardening learning" in the region, and is recognized as one of the two foremost collections of woody plants in the country.	1995	A view of a lake, reflecting the blue sky and white clouds from above. A line of trees exists along the horizon, and green plants float on the water along the treeline.
Dance	Square dance	When pioneers migrated west, they brought with them a dance known as the quadrille. A folk dance with four couples (eight dancers) arranged in a square, the square dance became the state dance on April 17, 1979.	1979	A group of dancers in colorful Western clothing promenading in a circle, with a man speaking into a microphone on a stage in the background.
Folk song	"Roll On, Columbia, Roll On"	The Bonneville Power Administration produced a film in the 1940s encouraging Pacific Northwest residents to use power generated by the recently built Bonneville and Grand Coulee dams along the Columbia River. Folk musician Woody Guthrie was hired to write songs for the project; "Roll On, Columbia, Roll On", described as "an ode to the harnessing of Washington's mightiest river", was the most popular of the 26 songs. In 1987, the song was officially designated as the state folk song by the Legislature.	1987	Black and white picture of a man in a plaid shirt and pin striped pants playing a guitar. A sticker with the phrase "This Machine Kills Fascists" appears on the guitar.
Ship	Lady Washington	Lady Washington is the name for the original wooden merchant sailing vessel that sailed during the 18th century as well as the updated modern replica created in 1989. Named after Martha Washington, the original ship left Boston Harbor on October 1, 1787, as part of the Columbia Expedition and foundered in 1797. The replica was built in Aberdeen as part of the state centennial celebrations of 1989.	2007	A wooden sailing vessel with numerous rope connecting from the deck to several large white sails above. An American flag drapes down from a pole at the back of the ship and a Washington state flag is on the tallest mast. The ship is in dark blue water, and in the background are a shoreline, treeline and cloudy sky.
Song	"Washington, My Home"	Written by Helen Davis in 1950 and arranged by Stuart Churchill, "Washington, My Home" was approved unanimously after a State Senator from South Bend introduced a bill proposing the song as the state song. In 1909, "Washington Beloved" was unofficially adopted as the state song but was never part of the state's code of law.	1959	—
Sport	Pickleball	A racket/paddle sport invented by several families using a modified badminton court on Bainbridge Island in 1965. It was approved as the state sport in 2022 following lobbying from the sport's national association.	2022	Two men playing pickleball at a dedicated court
Tartan	Washington state tartan	Consisting of a green background with stripes of blue, white, yellow, red, and black, the state tartan of Washington was designed by Margaret McLeod van Nus and Frank Cannonita in 1988 to commemorate the Washington centennial celebration and is registered with the Scottish Tartans Society. The colors represent various aspects of nature: green symbolizes rich forests of the state; blue the lakes, rivers and ocean; white the snow-capped mountains; red the apple and cherry crops; yellow the wheat and grain crops; and black the eruption of Mount St. Helens.	1991	A green square cut into equal quarters by yellow, black, and blue "stitched" lines. Red and white stitches outline the entire square, and patches of blue and green fill the inner quadrants.

== Unofficial symbols and unsuccessful proposals ==
While most states have an official motto and nickname, the Washington Legislature never officially adopted either. "Al-ki", meaning "by and by" in Chinook Jargon, is the state's unofficial motto, first appearing on the territorial seal designed by Lt. J.K. Duncan. Washington was unofficially nicknamed "The Evergreen State" by pioneer and historian C.T. Conover for its abundant evergreen forests.

Several symbols have been proposed for addition to the list of official state symbols but were never adopted. Proposed symbols have included Richard Berry's "Louie Louie" or Dana Lyons' "Our State Is a Dumpsite" as the state song and Aplets and Cotlets (a confection made from apples and apricots by Liberty Orchards) as the state candy. The designation of sasquatch as the state's official cryptid or monster has been proposed since the 1970s, going as far as a joke proclamation issued by Governor Daniel J. Evans in 1970.

== See also ==
- Outline of Washington (state)
