= Washington state tartan =

Official tartan of Washington state

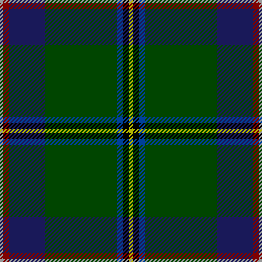
Official Washington state tartan

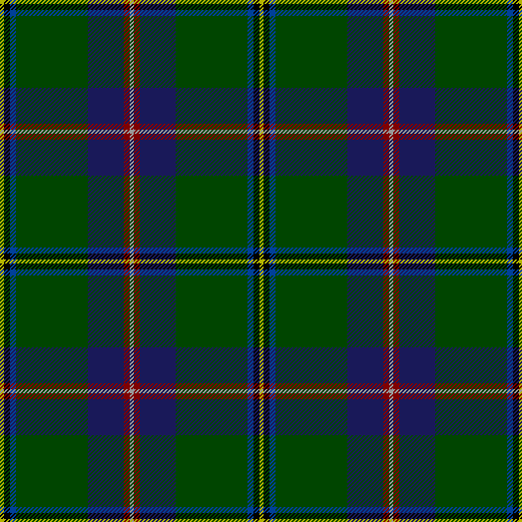
Official Washington State tartan in a four set block to display the repeat design

The Washington state tartan is the official state tartan established by the Washington state legislature.

Consisting of a green background with stripes of blue, white, yellow, red, and black, the state tartan of Washington was designed by Margaret McLeod van Nus and Frank Cannonito in 1988 to commemorate the Washington centennial celebration. It was registered with the Scottish Tartans Society after its adoption by the state legislature in 1991. The colors represent various aspects of nature: green symbolizes rich forests of the state; blue the lakes, rivers and ocean; white the snow-capped mountains; red the apple and cherry crops; yellow the wheat and grain crops; and black the eruption of Mount St. Helens.

== See also ==
- List of Washington state symbols
- List of U.S. state tartans
- The Scottish Registry of Tartans: the "Washington State" tartan, the "Tartan Day Society of Washington State, The" tartan, and the "Washington State University Cougar" tartan.
