= Washington, My Home =

Washington's state song

- State anthem of Washington
- Lyrics: Helen Davis, 1951
- Music: Stuart Churchill, 1951
- Adopted: March 19, 1959

Audio sample
- "Washington, My Home" performed by the Tumwater Girls' Choir in 2002 (sample): file; help

"Washington, My Home" (sometimes stylized "Washington My Home") is the state song of Washington, in the United States. It was composed in 1951 by Helen Davis and set to music by Stuart Churchill under the name "America, My Home". Subsequently, retitled and rewritten as "Washington, My Home", it was made the state song in 1959 by an act of the Washington State Legislature. An earlier anthem, "Washington Beloved", was declared the state song in 1909 by a ceremonial resolution of the state legislature.

== History ==
=== Predecessor ===
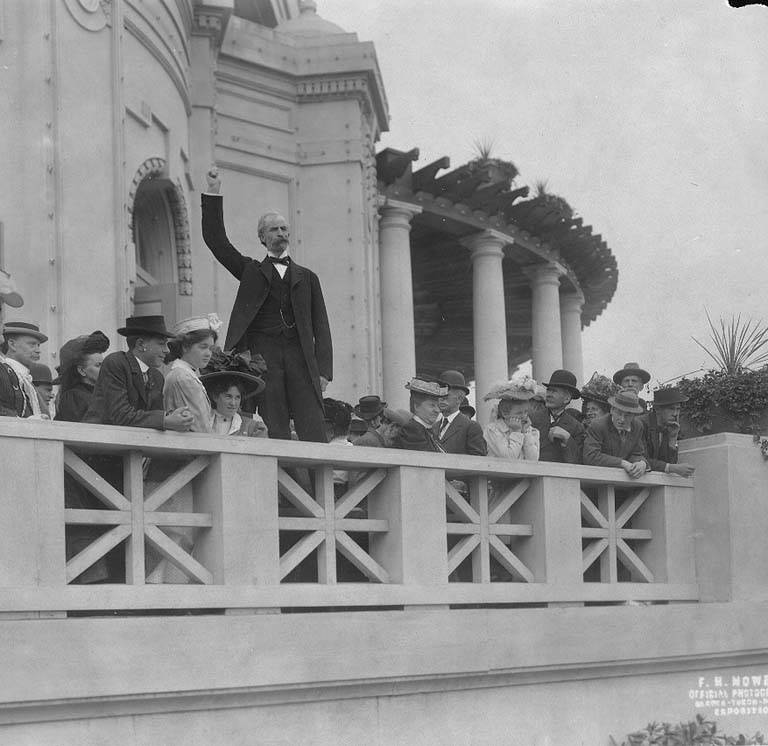
Edmond Meany (pictured, standing) wrote the lyrics to "Washington Beloved".

"Washington Beloved" was written by Edmond Meany for the University of Washington's 1906 songbook. Penned in four verses, the melody was composed by Reginald De Koven who agreed to set Meany's words to music for $100, which was paid by the Associated Students of the University of Washington. It was debuted by the University of Washington Glee Club on December 13, 1907. The following month, "Washington Beloved" was also performed during dedication ceremonies of Lorado Taft's statue of George Washington at the University of Washington campus in Seattle, following orations by Meany and French ambassador Jean Jules Jusserand.

While Meany did not intend for "Washington Beloved" to be anything more than a collegiate song, a movement started to establish it as the state anthem, the lyrics being equally suitable for such use and the composer – de Koven – sufficiently prominent.

"Washington Beloved" was declared the Washington state anthem on March 11, 1909, by concurrent resolution of the two chambers of the Washington state legislature sitting in joint session, the act signed by Governor Marion E. Hay on March 18 of that year. Ten members of the legislature, all from Eastern Washington, abstained from voting on the resolution due to the song's lyrics which referred to "purple banners", purple being one of the school colors of the University of Washington, rival to the eastern-situated Washington State College. Concurrent resolutions in joint session are only ceremonial expressions of the will of the legislature so the establishment of "Washington Beloved" was not codified as state law.

In 1935, the Washington Emergency Relief Administration printed and distributed copies of "Washington Beloved" to all of the state's children. Despite these and other efforts, however, the song fell into disuse.

Prior to World War II, the Theodore Presser Company obtained distribution rights to "Washington Beloved" from the John Church Company and renamed it "Loyal and True" with the intent of licensing it as a generic school song for use by universities, though it did not gain popularity in this incarnation either.

=== Composition and adoption ===
"Washington, My Home" was written by Helen Davis of South Bend, Washington and arranged by Stuart Churchill as "America, My Home" for the Pacific County Centennial Pageant of 1951. The following year, Davis rewrote the lyrics and retitled the song "Washington, My Home" to enter into the 1953 Washington centennial song competition, commemorating the establishment and independence of Washington Territory from Oregon Territory in 1853.

In 1959, "Washington, My Home" was declared the state song in an 89–5 vote of the Washington House of Representatives and a unanimous vote of the state senate, the act thereafter promulgated by Governor Albert Rosellini. Rosellini signed the legislation establishing the song as the anthem in the governor's office in Olympia on March 19, 1959, with Davis present at the signing. Others present as witnesses included Frederick Cohn, the former president of the Washington Federation of Music Clubs; Dale Nordquist, a member of the state senate from Centralia; and Joe Chytil, a member of the state house from Chehalis.

=== Amendment attempts ===
==== 1985 proposal ====
Senator Arlie DeJarnatt speaks during floor debate in March 1985 regarding the status of the state song.

In 1985, television host Ross Shafer began a campaign to replace "Washington, My Home" as the state song with "Louie, Louie", on the basis that the latter song was popularized by Tacoma, Washington, resident Rockin' Robin Roberts two years prior to it achieving national acclaim as a rock standard. After several county governments enacted resolutions supporting the campaign, a rally was held on the steps of the Washington State Capitol featuring The Fabulous Wailers, The Kingsmen, and Paul Revere and the Raiders, who performed a 30-minute version of the tune. The growing seriousness of the campaign, however, prompted a backlash from members of the legislature; the Washington Post reported, at the time, that two factions developed among lawmakers, one determined to preserve "Washington, My Home" and the other agitating for its replacement with Woody Guthrie's "Roll On, Columbia, Roll On". The latter faction secured Guthrie's son, Arlo, to fly to Washington and perform "Roll On, Columbia, Roll On" at the Capitol. Meanwhile, residents of Idaho and Oregon began protesting the proposed adoption of "Louie, Louie" saying their states had a better claim on the song than Washington while the aging Helen Davis also expressed ire at the potential abandonment of her work.

In a floor debate, Representative Bob Basich of Aberdeen, Washington, denounced the move to adopt "Louie, Louie", saying it would be like "making marijuana our state plant". As a compromise, the legislature ultimately preserved "Washington, My Home" as the state song while also adopting "Louie, Louie" as the state rock anthem and "Roll On, Columbia, Roll On" as the official folk song.

==== 2011 proposal ====
In 2011, papers were filed to place a referendum on the general election ballot to change the state song from "Washington, My Home" to the Seattle SuperSonics fight song – "Not In Our House" by Sir Mix-a-Lot – until such time as an NBA franchise was reassigned to Seattle at which time the song would have reverted to "Washington, My Home". The sponsor of the effort, Kris Brannon, said he undertook the attempt to raise awareness of the Sonics' then-imminent departure for Oklahoma City. The proposal would have required a petition signed by 241,153 registered voters to qualify for inclusion on the election ballot; no signatures were submitted by the deadline.

== Reception ==
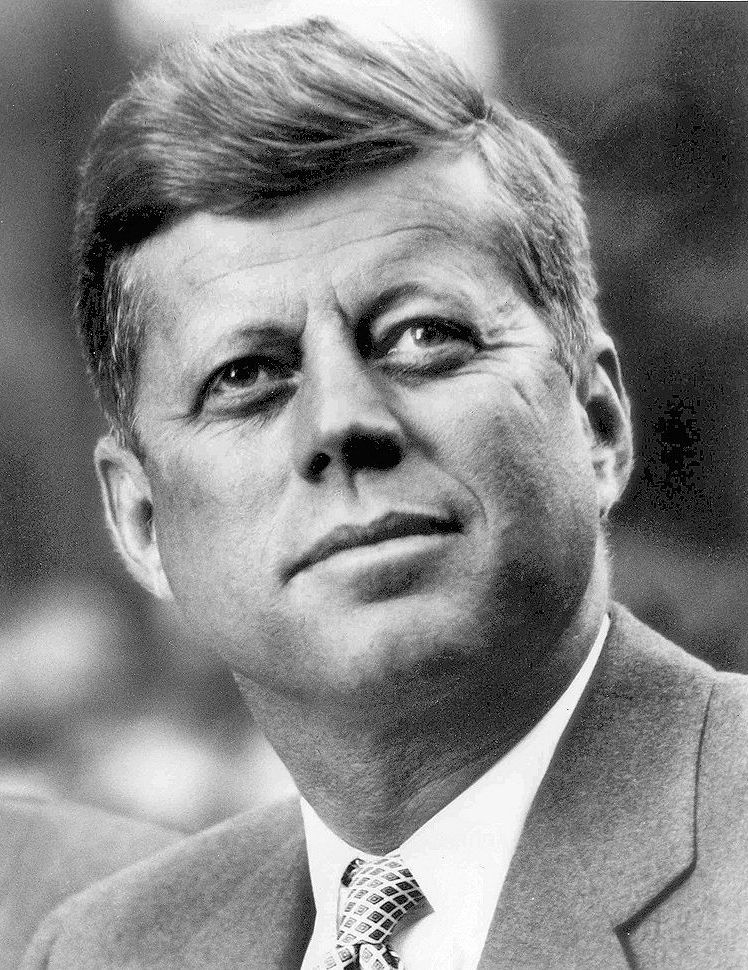
John F. Kennedy (pictured) suggested a lyric from "Washington, My Home" replace the state's motto Alki.

Following the designation of "Washington, My Home" as state song, Harry Bauer – the former director of libraries at the University of Washington – opined that:

... it is highly questionable whether legislators are well advised in usurping the traditional prerogative of citizens by arbitrarily adopting a state song. In questions relating to fine arts, a legislature should confirm, not affirm. Congress did not make "The Star-Spangled Banner" our national anthem in 1931. Years after the people of the United States decided the matter, Congress merely officially approved the choice.

John F. Kennedy once praised the lyrics of "Washington, My Home" and suggested its line "for you and me, a destiny" replace the state's commonly accepted, though unofficial, motto Alki, the latter a word in the local creole Chinook Jargon roughly meaning "by and by", "eventually", or "future".

== Legal status ==
=== Codification ===
Section 1.20.070 of the Revised Code of Washington (RCW) sets forth that:

The song, music and lyrics, "Washington My Home", composed by Helen Davis, is hereby designated as the official song of the state of Washington.

Section 1.20.071 of the RCW goes on to provide that:

All proceeds from the sale of the official song of the state as designated in RCW 1.20.070 shall be placed in the general fund.

=== Copyright ===
In August 1959, Davis assigned the copyright of the song to the State of Washington.

== See also ==
- List of Washington state symbols
