= Guy Louis Bush =

American evolutionary biologist (1929–2023)

- Born: 1929; Greenfield, Iowa, U.S.
- Died: 2023 (aged 93–94)
- Education: Iowa State University; Virginia Tech; Harvard University; University of Melbourne
- Known for: Research on speciation, especially sympatric speciation in the apple maggot fruit fly, Rhagoletis pomonella
- Awards: Guggenheim Fellowship (1977); John Hannah Distinguished Professor (1981); Fellow of the American Academy of Arts & Sciences (2001)
- Scientific career
- Fields: Evolutionary biology, Entomology
- Workplaces: University of Texas, Austin; Michigan State University
- Doctoral advisor: Ernst Mayr (implied)

Guy Louis Bush (1929–2023) was an evolutionary biologist, entomologist, and John Hannah Distinguished Professor at Michigan State University. He was also the first director of MSU's Graduate Program in Ecology, Evolution, and Behavior. Bush is best known for his research on the process of speciation, especially for his evidence of sympatric speciation in the apple maggot fruit fly, Rhagoletis pomonella, which shifted from using its native host, hawthorn tree, to using the domesticated apple tree in the last 150-200 years.

== Early life and education ==
Bush was born in 1929 in Greenfield, Iowa, where his father worked for the US Department of Agriculture (USDA). Bush spent formative years in Brazil, attending high school in Rio de Janeiro and spending a summer working at a lab in the Brazilian interior. He did his undergraduate studies at Iowa State University, obtaining a degree in entomology in 1953. He then served in US Army Medical Service Corps, followed by entomological research at a USDA laboratory in Mexico City from 1955 to 1957. Bush obtained a master’s degree in entomology from Virginia Tech, followed by his Ph.D. in biology from Harvard University and a postdoctoral fellowship at the University of Melbourne.

== Career and research ==
Bush joined the faculty at the University of Texas, Austin, in 1966. Many of his summers were spent doing field work in Door County, Wisconsin, where he and his students studied the fruit flies (family Tephritidae) that live in the localorchards. He moved to MSU in 1981, retiring from there in 2001. In 1987, Bush became the inaugural director of the graduate program in Ecology and Evolutionary Biology at MSU.

While at Harvard, Bush described several species in the genus of fruit flies, Rhagoletis. He began to focus on the process of speciation, rather than the description of species, when he met Ernst Mayr, who was then the leading authority on speciation, during Bush's doctoral studies at Harvard. While Mayr was skeptical of the possibility of sympatric speciation, Bush’s research on the apple maggot fruit fly is considered to provide a particularly strong case for that process, one that continues to be built upon by later workers. Specifically, Bush reasoned that phytophagous insects that both consume and reproduce on specific host plants provide opportunities for speciation without strict geographical isolation (as in allopatric speciation) because, as the insects adapt to feeding on a new host plant, they are also more likely to mate with other members of their species that prefer that new host.

On his death in 2023, Kay Holekamp, a behavioral ecologist and later director of the EEB program at MSU, said of Bush: "He was a real prince of a human being, super smart, and inspirational in his development of the Rhagoletis system to study sympatric speciation." Bush authored over 100 scientific papers and, as of August 2024, has an h-index of 52.

== Honors ==
Bush received a Guggenheim Fellowship in 1977. In 1981, he was Vice President of the American Society of Naturalists, and President of the Society for the Study of Evolution. That same year, Bush was appointed as the John Hannah Distinguished Professor of Evolutionary Biology at MSU in 1981. He was a Visiting Fellow at All Souls College, Oxford, in 1990-1991, and in 2001, Bush was elected a Fellow of the American Academy of Arts & Sciences.
