= Old Apple Tree Park =

Apple tree in Vancouver, Washington, U.S.

Old Apple Tree
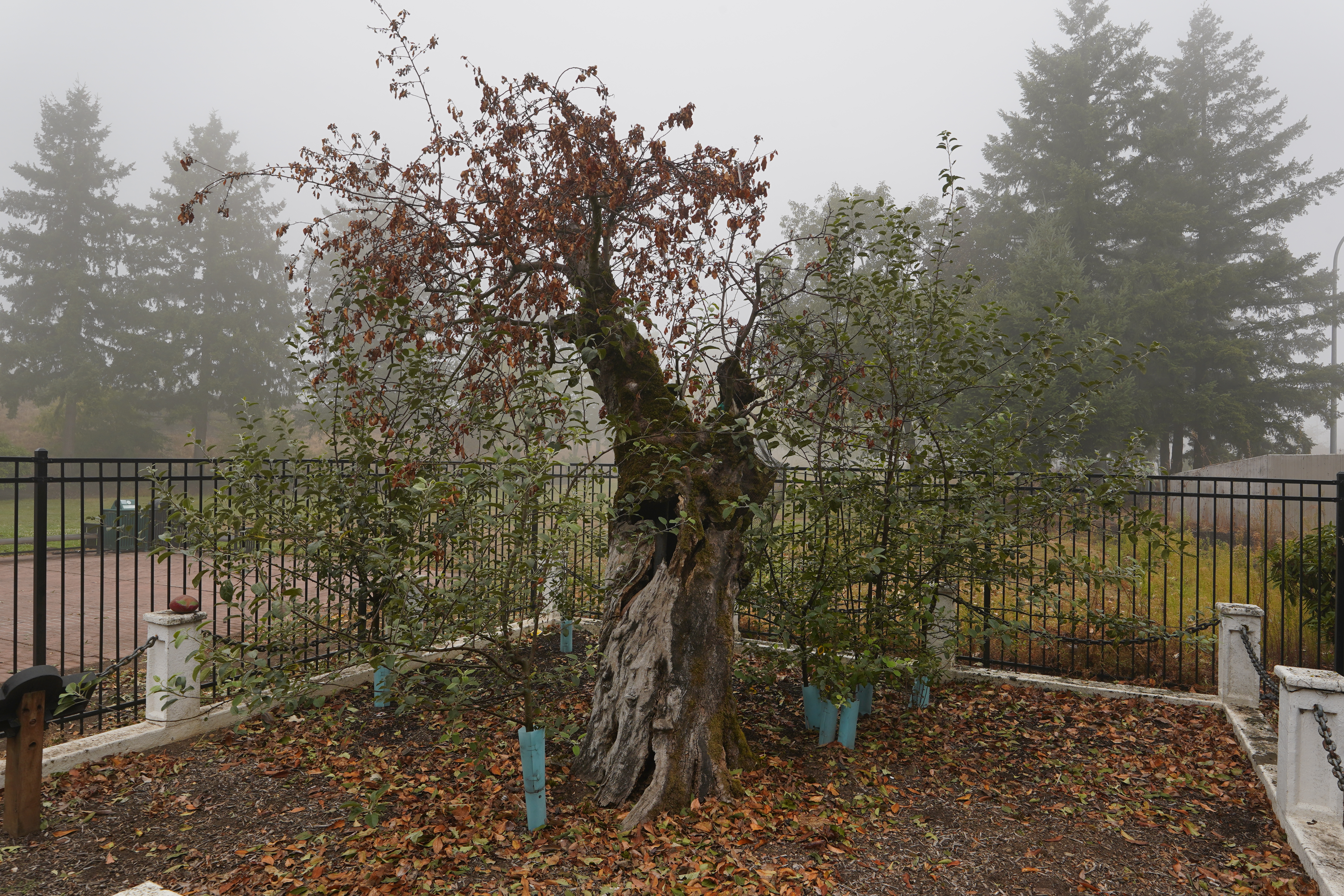
- Dead main trunk and surviving shoots, September 2020

- Location within Washington (state)
- Species: Apple
- Location: Vancouver, Washington, U.S.
- Coordinates: 45°37′19″N 122°40′11″W
- Date seeded: 1826
- Date felled: 2020
- Website: www.cityofvancouver.us/parksrec/page/old-apple-tree-park

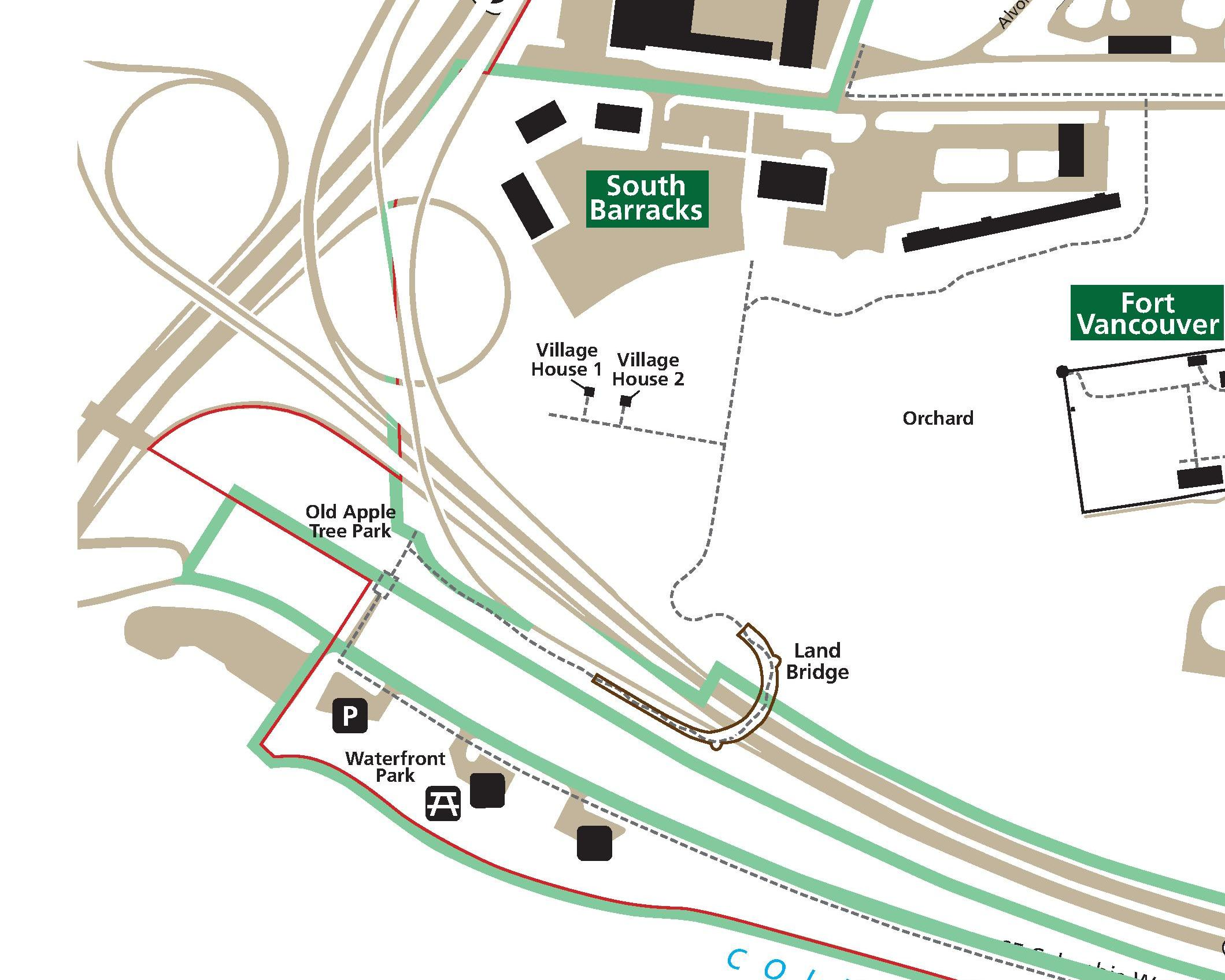
Old Apple Tree Park and orchard from the Fort Vancouver National Historic Site area map

The Old Apple Tree was an apple tree in Vancouver, Washington, United States, purported to be the oldest apple tree in the Pacific Northwest. Genetic testing determined that the apples produced are unique and distantly related to the 500-year-old French Reinette variety.

== History ==
The tree is believed to have been planted at Fort Vancouver in 1826 by British Royal Navy officer Lieutenant Aemilius Simpson from seeds obtained at a dinner party in London prior to his departure to the Pacific Northwest for the Hudson's Bay Company. It was "credited with starting the apple industry in Washington state" and survived several floods and the construction of nearby roads and railroads. The tree was at Old Apple Tree Park on the north side of the Columbia River and south side of State Route 14. The annual Old Apple Tree Festival in Vancouver celebrated the tree's birthday in October with giveaways of cuttings by the city forester.

The apple tree, which had been in ailing health for some time, died in June 2020 at the age of 194. Although the tree's trunk was "declared dead", the root system remains alive. The Old Apple Tree Research Team notes that there are saplings growing from the root system and stated that one will be cultivated to grow at the current tree's location to begin "a new chapter in its life".
