= Apple Maggot Quarantine Area =

Quarantine area in the U.S. state of Washington

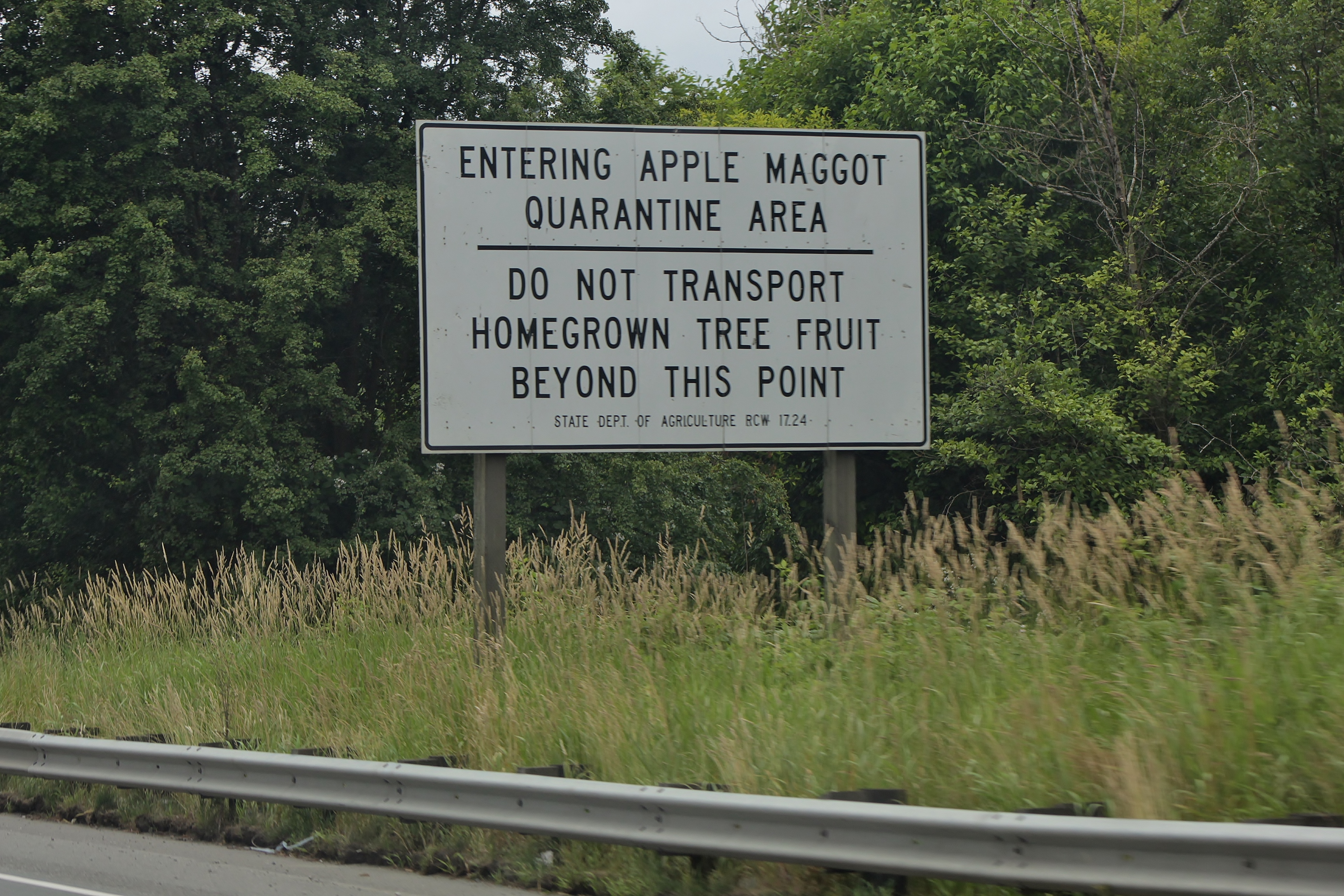
A quarantine sign on State Route 522 near Woodinville, Washington

The Apple Maggot Quarantine Area is a permanent quarantine area established by the U.S. state of Washington. The quarantine was authorized under Washington state law and the area's boundaries are periodically reset by the state's Department of Agriculture. The quarantine was declared in the early 1980s to arrest the spread of the apple maggot into a portion of Eastern Washington.

== History ==
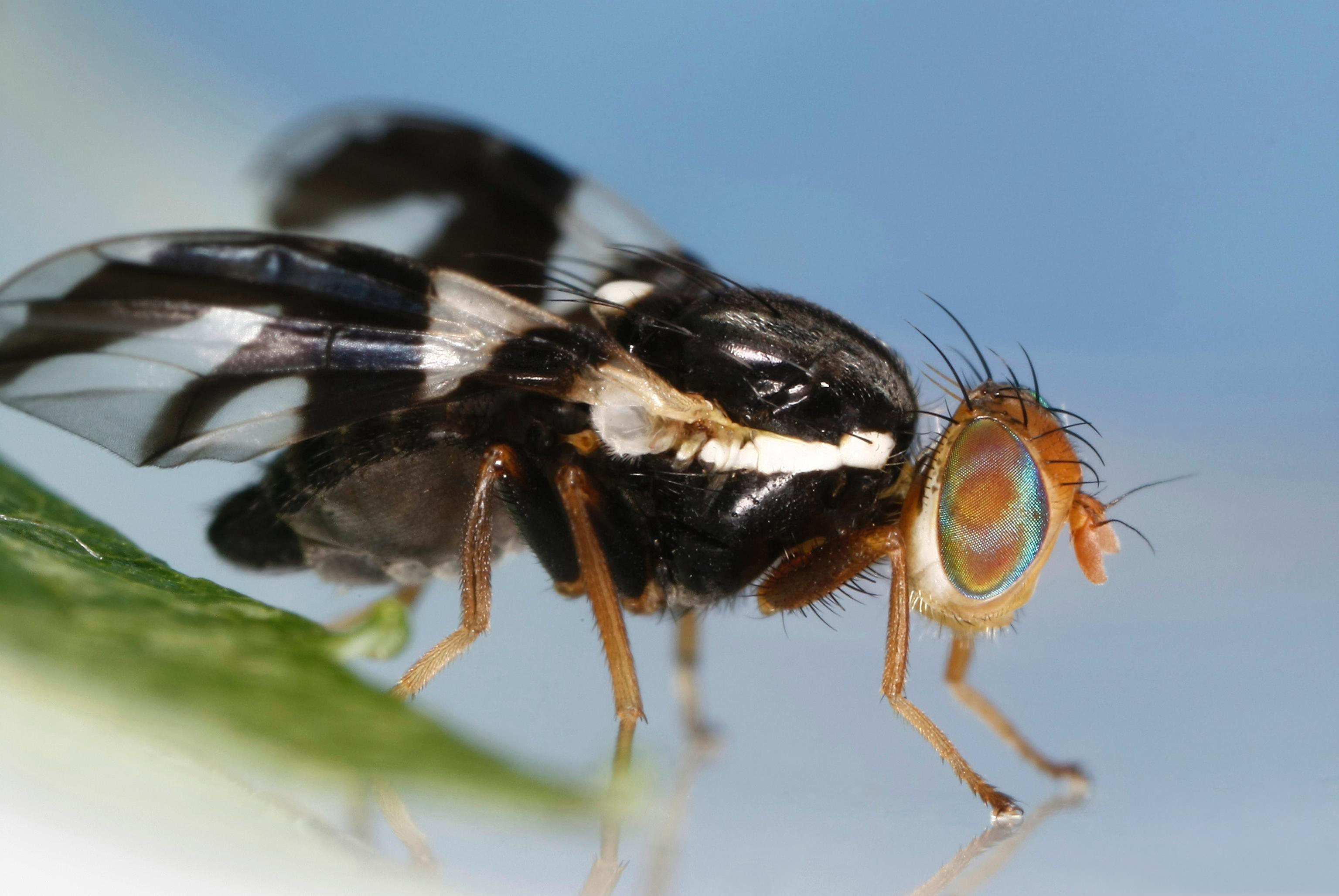
The Apple Maggot Quarantine Area was established to control the spread of the apple maggot (pictured) into a protected agricultural area of eastern Washington.

The apple maggot, which is not indigenous to the Pacific Northwest, was discovered to have arrived in Washington in 1980. The quarantine was declared thereafter and is designed to protect Washington's core apple growing regions from infestation. The Washington State Department of Transportation installed 70 signs along highways around the state in 1985 to warn of the quarantine.

Authority for the quarantine is codified under Title 17 of the Revised Code of Washington.

=== Purpose ===
Washington exported $718 million worth of apples in 2016, making apples the state's seventh largest export, and the apple has been declared the official state fruit. Almost two-thirds of all apples grown in the United States are produced in Washington. According to the Washington Apple Commission, the quality standards for Washington apples "are more stringent than grading standards used in any other growing region in the world". A mandatory inspection program requires apples, all of which are hand-picked, to meet this set of standards that, in some criteria factors, exceed those set by the United States Department of Agriculture.

The state's Department of Agriculture has said that the apple maggot threatens "Washington's iconic apple industry, as well as many of our other fruit crops". The establishment of reproducing populations of the apple maggot within Washington would have a devastating impact on the state's apple industry resulting from the potential loss of export markets.

== Quarantine regulations ==
=== Quarantine extent, procedures, and efficacy ===
Each year, the Washington state Department of Agriculture deploys apple maggot traps to a selection of sites in the state with between 5,500 and 8,500 traps deployed annually. The traps are yellow paneled, adhesive traps baited with ammonium carbonate lures. The area surrounding locations which successfully trap apple maggots may be further studied by analyzing fruit in the area for the presence of apple maggot larvae and, ultimately, placed in the quarantine zone. In 2011, for instance, the trapping of 35 apple maggots at 23 locations in Chelan County resulted in a recommendation to extend the quarantine zone to the western part of that county.

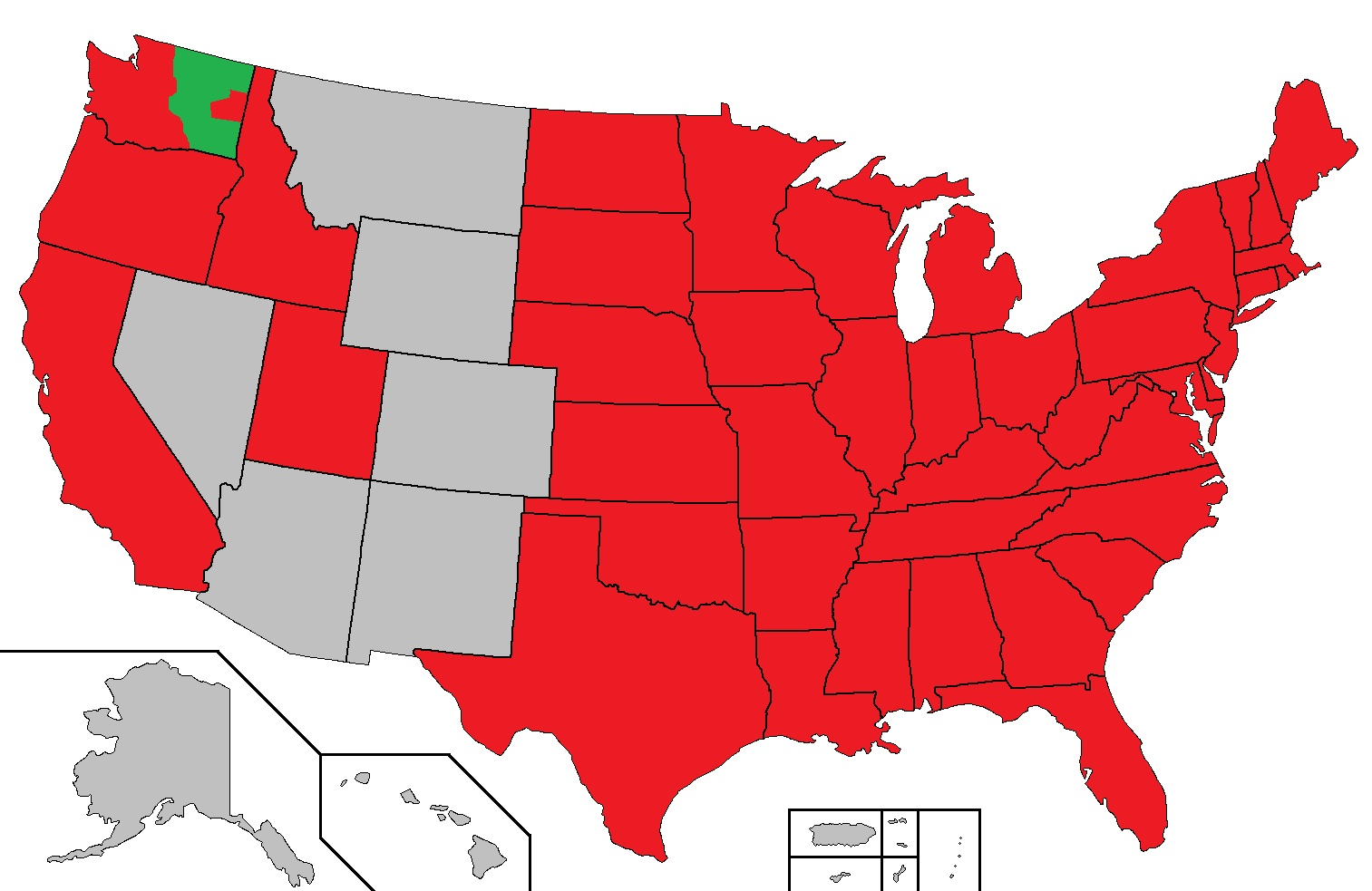
A map showing the approximate boundaries of the Apple Maggot Quarantine Area within the United States as of 2017. Areas in red are under quarantine by Washington state, areas in grey are those outside the state free from quarantine, and areas in green are those within Washington free from quarantine.

The states of Oregon, California, Idaho, and Utah, all areas of the eastern United States, and all "foreign countries where apple maggot is established" have also been placed under quarantine by Washington. In addition to these areas, as of 2017, all or portions of the state's counties of Chelan, Clallam, Clark, Cowlitz, Grays Harbor, Island, Jefferson, King, Kitsap, Klickitat, Lewis, Lincoln, Mason, Pacific, Pierce, Snohomish, Spokane, Skagit, Skamania, Thurston, Wahkiakum, Whatcom, and Yakima, are also quarantined.

Washington State University's Tree Fruit Research and Extension Center has cited the fact that "apple maggots have never been found in commercially packed fruit in the state" as evidence of the quarantine's efficacy.

=== Terms of the quarantine ===
There is a prohibition on transporting homegrown or foraged fruit from the quarantine zone into the pest free zone, except for fruit that has first been processed through canning, jarring, juicing, or drying. In addition, any yard waste from the quarantine zone must be disposed of within the zone and cannot be transported across its boundaries. Store-bought fruit is exempt from the quarantine as it is already subject to inspection by state authorities.

In addition, under state law pest control officials can order property owners to spray with pesticides trees in which the apple maggot has been observed.

== Incidents ==
In September 2020, a crate of apples brought by Washington governor Jay Inslee to Bridgeport and Malden following major wildfires was found to contain apple maggots. The apples were picked at the Washington Governor's Mansion in Olympia and distributed by the governor's office during an official visit. This was accidental and was meant to be an empathetic gesture from the governor and governor's mansion.

== In popular culture ==
Apple Maggot Quarantine Area, also known as A.M.Q.A., was the name of a metal band from Seattle active from 1985 to 1989.

== See also ==
- California Border Protection Stations
- Plant Protection and Quarantine
