= Ronald J. Prokopy =

American entomologist (1935–2004)

Ronald John Prokopy (28 September 1935–14 May 2004) was an American entomologist who was a specialist on the behavior and biology of Rhagoletis flies and approaches to their management in apple orchards.

Prokopy was born in Danbury, Connecticut where he grew up on a farm. He went to study at Cornell University obtaining a BS in agriculture in 1957 and a PhD in entomology working under advisor George Gyrisco. His thesis was on the alfalfa weevil. He began studies on tephritid flies at Connecticut from 1964 to 1968 followed by studies in Switzerland. He then joined the University of Texas examining the biology of Rhagoletis pomonella. He examined host detection, courtship, and other biological bases for the use of apple tree hosts. Prokopy was known for his innovative and low-tech approaches to the study of insect behavior. Among his innovations was the use of red spheres for monitoring and managing populations of Rhagoletis. A commercial version of the trap, known as the Ladd trap, includes a red hemisphere placed at the centre of flat yellow sticky plate. He worked at the University of Massachusetts Amherst from 1975.
