= Washington Apple Commission =

Apple board in the state of Washington, United States

The Washington Apple Commission is a quasi-public body in the United States state of Washington, created by the Revised Code of Washington, which is statutorily authorized to "speak on behalf of the Washington state government with regard to apples and apple-related issues".

The commission is headquartered in Wenatchee, where it used to maintain a visitor center which had exhibits on Washington apples and apple harvesting technology, but ceased operations in 2021. As of 2017 it had an annual budget of approximately $10.4 million. Its president that year was Todd Fryhover.
