= History of slavery in Georgia =

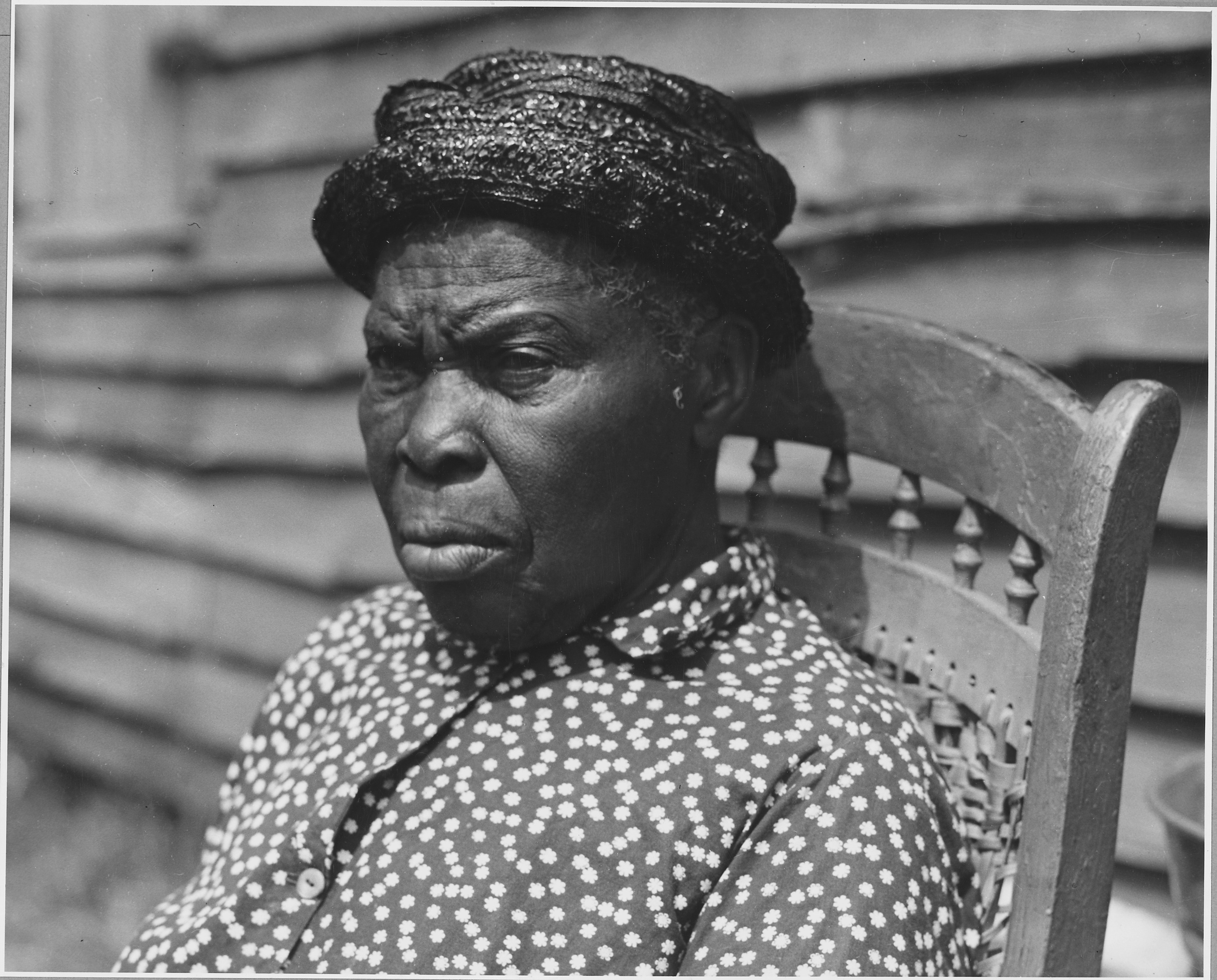
Original caption of 1941 photograph: "Harmony Community, Putnam County, Georgia...This old woman was a slave and belonged to the family on whose place she now lives. She was a small girl when Sherman's army came through." (U.S. Department of Agriculture via NARA)

Slavery in Georgia is known to have been practiced by European colonists. During the colonial era, the practice of slavery in Georgia soon became surpassed by industrial-scale plantation slavery.

The colony of the Province of Georgia under James Oglethorpe banned slavery in 1735, the only one of the thirteen colonies to have done so. However, it was legalized by royal decree in 1751, in part due to George Whitefield's support for the institution of slavery.

== Pre-colonial period ==
Native Americans enslaved members of their own and other tribes before Europeans arrived (and afterwards, continuing into the 1800s); slaves might or might not be adopted eventually, especially if enslaved as children; and the enslavement might or might not be hereditary. Native American slaves included captives from wars and slave raids; captives bartered from other tribes, sometimes at great distances; children sold by their parents during famines; and men and women who staked themselves in gambling when they had nothing else, which put them into servitude in some cases for life. However, there were differences between the styles of slavery. European slavery was specifically focused racism and the concept of racial inferiority, something that had not been documented in Native American societies prior to contact.

== Colonial America (1526–1765) ==
The life of a slave in Colonial America differed greatly depending on the colony, nature of work, the size of the enslaved workforce, temperament, and the power of the enslaver. Additionally there had been a variety of psychological experiences of those that experienced slavery from birth, versus those born free, and differences across the different ethnicities.

The first enslaved Africans in Georgia arrived in 1526 with Lucas Vázquez de Ayllón's establishment of San Miguel de Gualdape on the current Georgia coast, after failing to establish the colony on the Carolina coast. They rebelled and lived with indigenous people, destroying the colony in less than two months.

Two centuries later, Georgia was the last of the Thirteen Colonies to be established and the furthest south (Florida was not one of the Thirteen Colonies). Founded in the 1730s, Georgia's powerful backers did not object to slavery as an institution, but their business model was to rely on labor from Britain (primarily England's poor) and they were also concerned with security, given the closeness of then Spanish Florida, and Spain's regular offers to enemy-slaves to revolt or escape. Despite agitation for slavery, it was not until a defeat of the Spanish by Georgia colonials in the 1740s that arguments for opening the colony to slavery intensified. To staff the rice plantations and settlements, Georgia's proprietors relented in 1751, and African slavery grew quickly. After becoming a royal colony, in the 1760s Georgia began importing slaves directly from Africa.

In the winter of 1760, Henry Ellis, the second Royal Governor of the colony of Georgia (1758–1760) retired from his position and returned to Britain from the Americas. Soon after his arrival, he sold a young enslaved male servant that had accompanied him on the long voyage, to a man called Pickering Robinson. This young man came to be known as Joseph Robinson.

Before being made Governor of Georgia, Henry Ellis was a well known navigator and slave trader. Between 1750 and 1755, Captain Ellis sailed at least three times from Bristol to Anomabu and Cape Coast Castle (on the shores of what we today know as Ghana), as well as Sierra Leone. On board his ship, the Halifax, he carried hundreds of enslaved Africans to Jamaica and Antigua, before returning to Bristol Ellis’ involvement went further than trading human cargo. In 1752 the Halifax formed part of a convoy of ships that requested supplies to build a new fort at Anomabu. Records confirm the intention to capture 40 slaves from the River Gambia to build the new fort, who would then be moved on to Cape Castle.

Pickering Robinson worked in Savannah Georgia from 1750 to 1758. He came to Savannah as a 24 year old expert in sericulture, employed by King George II on a significant wage, to help establish silk production in the area. Though Pickering would certainly have become acquainted with Governor Ellis when he took office in 1758, Pickering's knowledge of silk production proved poor and he returned to England the same year.

Pickering Robinson was born in 1726 and married Mary in Walthamstow, London in 1753. He named the young man he purchased from Governor Ellis in 1760 after his uncle and benefactor who bequeathed him land in Lincolnshire shortly before his voyage to the Americas in 1750. Joseph was well known in certain parts of London. He was also baptised, the document provides his age (25, so born 1741). Joseph became one of many enslaved servants in London who sought to secure their own freedom by running away. He left Pickering Robinsons house on the 11th March 1767.

‘RUN away on Saturday Night, about Nine o’Clock, March 7, 1767, a (-) Man, named JOSEPH ROBINSON, bought of Governor Ellis in Georgia in the Year 1760, well known in the Parish of St. Botolph, Bishopsgate, about 5 Feet 5 Inches high, his Hair cut short, is well made, had on when he went away a light-coloured mixed Cloth Coat and Waistcoat, an under red Waistcoat, black Worsted Breeches, Silver Buckles in his Shoes, and a Silver Stock Buckle, speaks good English, and can write. If he should offer himself as a Servant, it is hoped no Gentleman will receive or employ him, he being the Property of Pickering Robinson, late of Devonshire Square, and now living in Paternoster Row, SpitalFields. N.B. Any Person who is aiding or assisting in the Escape, or endeavours to conceal or harbour the said (-) Man, will be prosecuted as the Law directs. Masters and Commanders of Ships are desired not to take him on board.’

== Federalist Era (1788–1801) ==
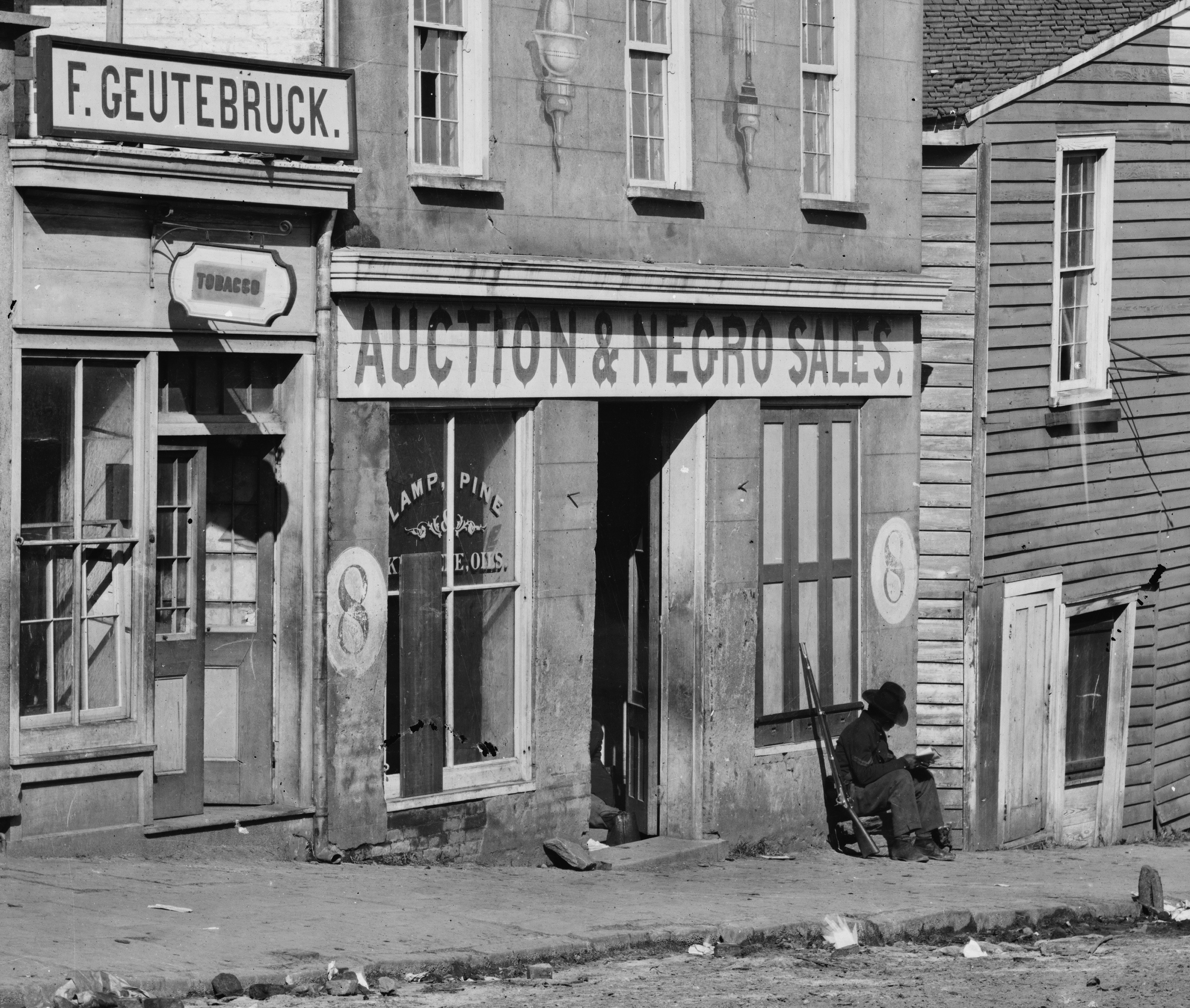
Crawford, Frazer & Co. slave trading business in Atlanta, photographed 1864

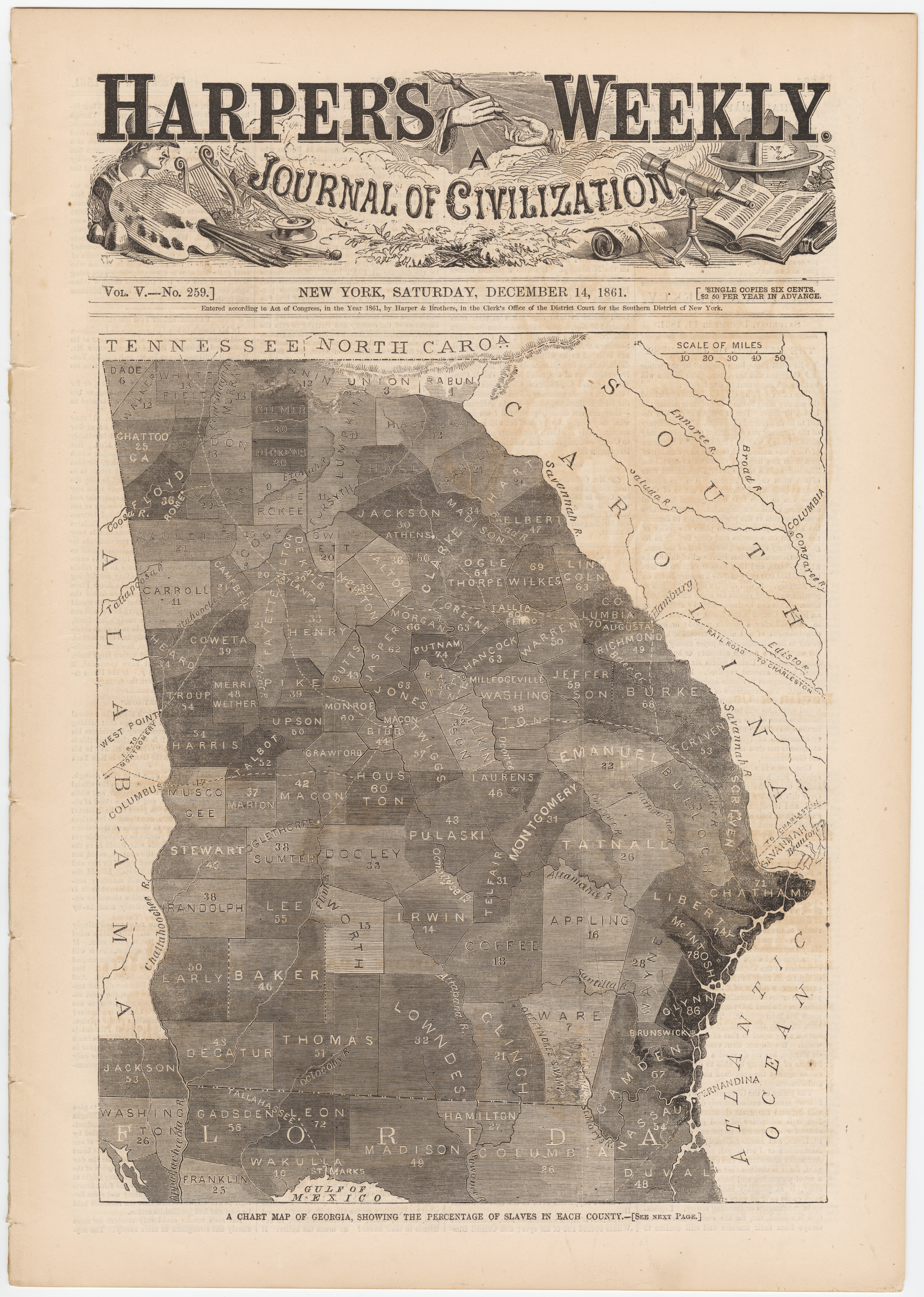
Georgia Slavery Map from 1861 published in Harper's Weekly, December 14, 1861

=== Birthplace of the cotton gin (1793) ===
Georgia figures significantly in the history of American slavery because of Eli Whitney's invention of the cotton gin in 1793. The gin was first demonstrated to an audience on Revolutionary War hero General Nathanael Greene's plantation, near Savannah. The cotton gin's invention led to both the burgeoning of cotton as a cash crop and to the revitalization of the agricultural slave labor system in the northern states. The U.S. economy soon became dependent upon cotton production and the sale of cotton to northern and English textile manufacturers.

== Domestic slave trade ==
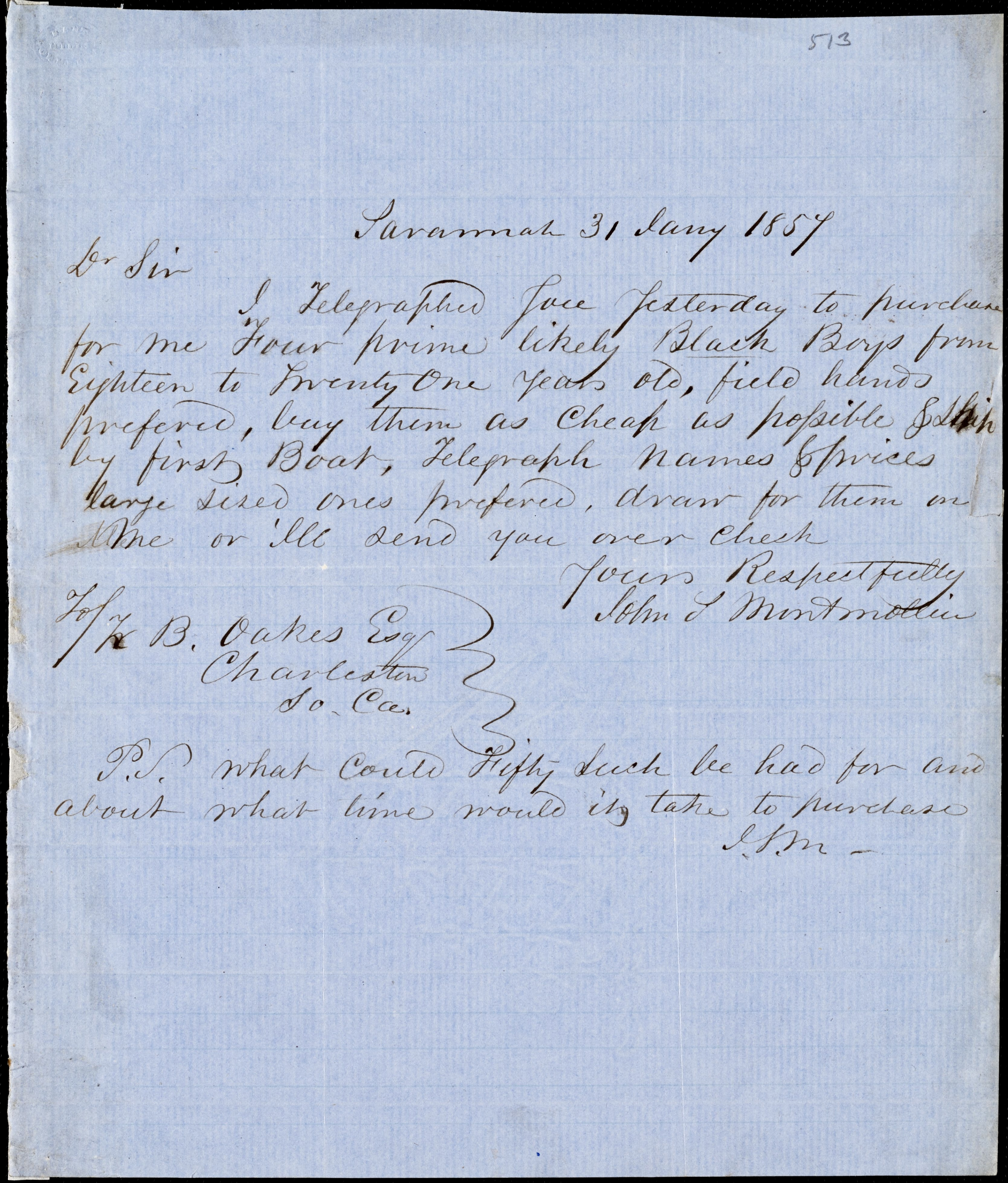
John S. Montmollin, trader of Savannah, to Ziba B. Oakes, trader of Charleston, letter of January 31, 1857, requesting four "Black Boys" ages 18 to 21, large-size ones preferred, field hands preferred, "buy them as cheap as possible" (Boston Public Library Anti-Slavery Collection donated by James Redpath via William Lloyd Garrison)

Slave markets existed in several Georgia cities and towns, including Albany, Atlanta, Augusta, Columbus, Macon, Milledgeville, and above all, in Savannah. In 1859 Savannah was the site of a slave sale colloquially known as the Weeping Time, one of the largest slave sales in the history of the United States. Historian E.A. Pollard wrote in 1858, "Macon, you must know, is one of the principal marts for slaves in the South. Some time ago, I attended on the city's confines an extraordinarily large auction of slaves, including a gang of sixty-one from a plantation in southwestern Georgia. The prices brought were comparatively low, as there was no warranty of soundness, and owing very much, also, to the fact that the slaves were all sold in families." At the beginning of the American Civil War, active traders in Atlanta included Robert M. Clarke, Solomon Cohen, Crawford, Frazer & Co., Fields and Gresham, W. H. Henderson, Inman, Cole & Co., Zachariah A. Rice, A. K. Seago, B. D. Smith, and Whitaker and Turner.

Importing slaves to Georgia was illegal from 1788 until the law was repealed in 1856. Despite these restrictions, researchers estimate that Georgians "transported approximately fifty thousand bonded African Americans" from other slave states between 1820 and 1860. Some of these imports were legal transfers, others were not. Samuel Oakes, the father of a Charleston slave trader named Ziba B. Oakes, was implicated in illegally importing slaves to Georgia in 1844, which resulted in a newspaper notice about the case from Savannah mayor William Thorne Williams that concluded, "The laws of our State are severe, inflicting heavy fines and Penitentiary confinement on such as shall be convicted of these offences Our own safety requires us to be vigilant in preventing the outcasts and convicted felons of other communities from being brought into ours. And all those entrusted with the administration of the laws are bound to use their utmost efforts to bring to just punishment such as shall be guilty of this nature."

Slaves intended for "personal use" could be imported which resulted in a number of workarounds used by traders. One described in the Anti-Slavery Bugle in 1843: "Hamburg, South Carolina was built up just opposite Augusta, for the purpose of furnishing slaves to the planters of Georgia. Augusta is the market to which the planters of Upper and Middle Georgia bring their cotton; and if they want to purchase negroes, they step over into Hamburg and do so. There are two large houses there, with piazzas in front to expose the 'chattels' to the public during the day, and yards in rear of them where they are penned up at night like sheep, so close that they can hardly breathe, with bull-dogs on the outside as sentinels. They sometimes have thousands here for sale, who in consequence of their number suffer most horribly."

=== Killing of traders Jesse Kirby and John Kirby ===
Another example of slave importation to Georgia during this period is known from the 1834 killing of "negro traders" Jesse Kirby and John Kirby by enslaved men they were transporting overland to Georgia in a coffle." The Kirbys had been to the slave markets of Baltimore (one enslaved person was purchased at Chestertown) and were traveling with a group of at least nine slaves through Virginia. The Kirbys were killed by enslaved men named George and Littleton at an overnight campsite near Bill's Tavern, around "Prince Edward C. House," near Farmville, Prince Edward County, Virginia, by between two and four enslaved men. Such campsites were apparently typical to the transportation of slaves by overland coffle, as a letter written from Georgia in 1833 described, "During this and other days I have passed by many negro traders, who were crossing to Alabama. These negro traders, in order to save expense, usually carry their own provisions, and encamp out at night. Passing many of these encampments early in the morning, when they were just pitching tents, I have observed groups of negroes hand-cuffed, probably to prevent them from running away. The driver told us, that a thousand negroes had gone on his road to Alabama, the present spring." Slaves working "collectively" to do violence to "cruel owners" was a comparative "rarity" in the history of antebellum violence by the enslaved in Virginia, but "Having left Maryland and their homes behind, [George, Littleton and their allies] likely believed that violence afforded them the last possible opportunity to escape whatever fate awaited them in Georgia. Georgia offered fewer opportunities for escape than Maryland. The movement south threw the slaves lives into flux."

Net slaves entries and exits to Georgia (Tadman 1989 via Slavery State by State)
Decade	Change
1790–1799	+6,095
1800–1809	+11,231
1810–1819	+10,731
1820–1829	+18,324
1830–1839	+10,403
1840–1849	+19,873
1850–1859	–7,876

== Civil War Era (1850–1865) ==
Georgia voted to secede from the Union and join the Confederate States of America on January 19, 1861. Years later, in 1865, during his March to the Sea, General William Tecumseh Sherman signed his Special Field Orders, No. 15, distributing some 400,000 acres (1,600 km^{2}) of confiscated land along the Atlantic coast from Charleston, South Carolina, to the St. Johns River in Florida to the slaves freed by the Union Army. Most of the settlers and their descendants are today known as the Gullah.

Slavery was officially abolished by the Thirteenth Amendment, which took effect on December 18, 1865. Slavery had been theoretically abolished by President Abraham Lincoln's Emancipation Proclamation in 1863, which proclaimed that only slaves located in territories that were in rebellion from the United States were free. Since the U.S. government was not in effective control of many of these territories until later in the war, many of these slaves proclaimed to be free by the Emancipation Proclamation were still held in servitude until those areas came back under Union control.

== Modern-day slavery ==
In November 2021, the U.S. Attorney's Office for the Southern District of Georgia announced an indictment of 24 people following Operation Blooming Onion and alleged a variety of crimes including forced labor, money laundering and mail fraud. The prosecutors described the defendants' actions as "modern-day slavery" and that they forced more than 100 people to work under threat of violence, confiscated their passports and documents, detained them in "work camps surrounded by electric fencing, or held in cramped living quarters, including dirty trailers with raw sewage leaks".

== Commemoration ==
In 2002, the City of Savannah unveiled a bronze statue on River Street, in commemoration of the Africans who were brought to this country as slaves through the city's port. River Street had been an active port for exporting the commodity cotton overseas, African American slaves carried cotton (as well as rice) from the warehouse areas to the boats, and African American slaves laid the cobble stones to create River Street.

In 2005, Wachovia Bank apologized to Georgia's African-American community for its predecessor (Georgia Railroad and Banking Company of Augusta's) role in the use of at least 182 slaves in the construction of the Georgia Railroad.

== See also ==
- List of Georgia slave traders
- Indian slave trade in the American Southeast
- African Americans in Georgia (U.S. state)
- Human trafficking in Georgia (U.S. state)
- List of plantations in Georgia (U.S. state)
- History of slavery in the United States by state
