= Operation Blooming Onion =

Criminal investigation in Georgia (U.S. state)

Operation Blooming Onion was an investigation conducted by the federal government of the United States into alleged fraud and criminal activity stemming from the H-2A visa program, primarily in South Georgia. The operation involved several federal agencies, led by Homeland Security Investigations. The investigation began in 2016 and resulted in the indictment of 24 individuals in 2021 for several crimes, including several counts of conspiracy. It is considered one of the largest law enforcement operations of its kind in U.S. history.

In South Georgia, many migrant workers, primarily from Latin America, are employed in agricultural work, including the harvest of Vidalia onions. These migrants are present via the H-2A visa program, which allows a person in the United States to sponsor workers, with the sponsor being required to provide payment, food, housing, and transportation for the worker. It wasn’t until one worker reported the abuse with the help of the Coalition of Immokalee Workers in 2015 that the federal government caught on to the criminal trafficking operation and began following the CIW’s leads to open a case. Federal investigators began investigating Maria Leticia Patricio and others associated with her, believing that they were operating a transnational criminal organization (TCO). Their investigation revealed that the TCO had brought in many migrant workers from Latin America who had been subject to exploitation and poor living and working conditions. Two individuals had died due to the conditions, and there were several reported incidents of kidnapping, violent threats, and rape. Investigators referred to the situation as one of "modern-day slavery".

In November 2021, federal investigators executed over 20 search warrants and announced indictments against 24 individuals, with charges including conspiracy to commit mail fraud, mail fraud, conspiracy to engage in forced labor, forced labor, conspiracy to commit money laundering, and tampering with a witness. Over the next several years, many of the accused have pled guilty. In the aftermath, over 100 individuals were freed from the scheme, and advocates have pushed for reforms within the federal government of the H-2A visa program.

== Background ==
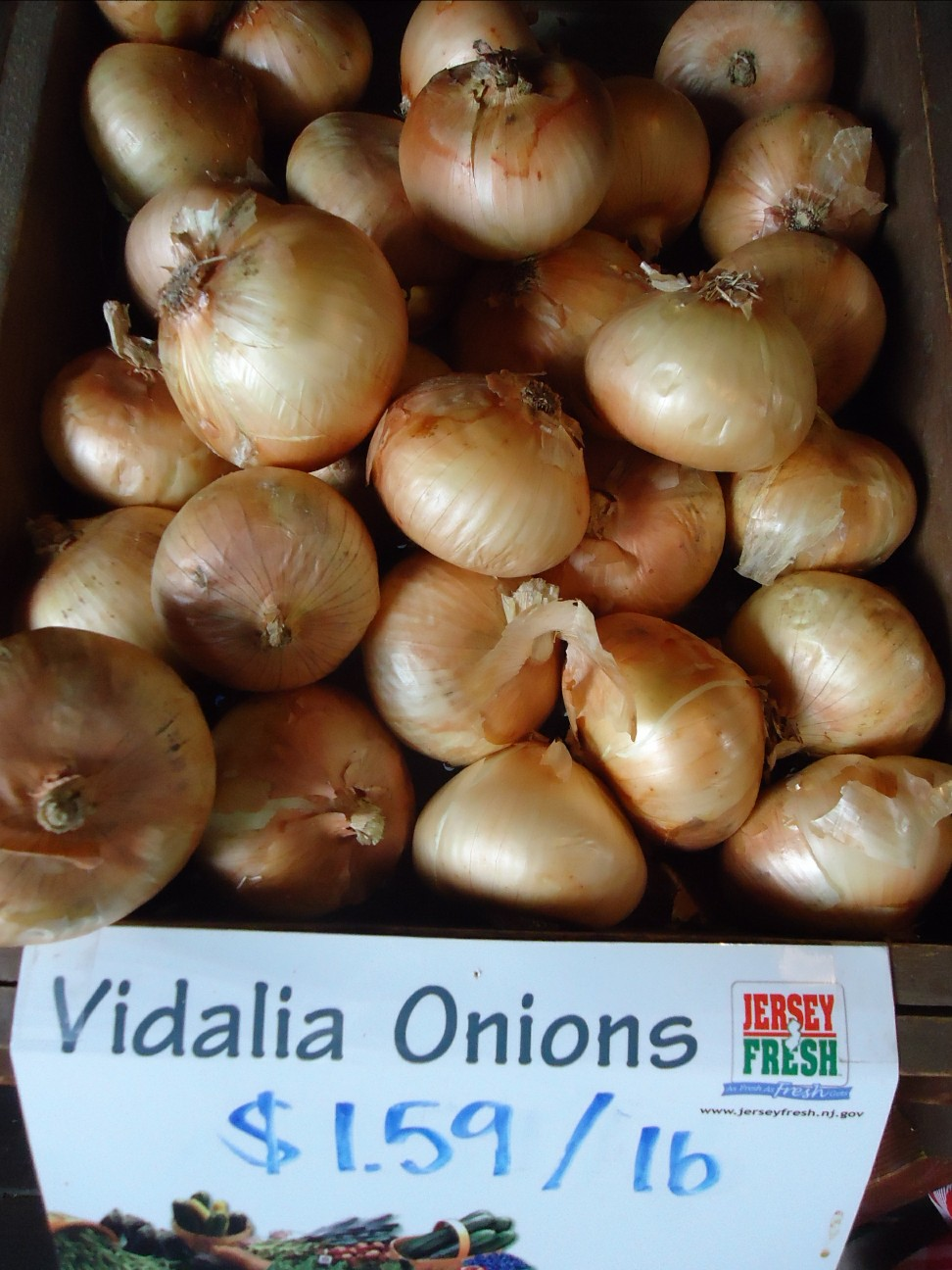
A collection of Vidalia onions

Vidalia onions are a type of sweet onion that are grown in South Georgia. The farms in the region that grow the crop often employ migrant workers from Latin America, primarily from Mexico, Central America, and the Caribbean. Many of these workers are present in the United States via the H-2A visa program, which allows foreign nationals to work in agriculture in the United States under a sponsor who is responsible for housing, feeding, paying, and providing transportation for the worker. Workers involved in the visa program are also required to be paid a fair wage, which in 2021 typically amounted to between $10 and $12 per hour (equivalent to between $12 and $14 in 2025). In South Georgia in 2022, the average hourly pay for harvesting Vidalia onions was $11.99 per hour ($13.19 in 2025), in addition to bonus piece rates that usually depended on how many onions were harvested.

From the 2010s through the 2020s, the H-2A visa program grew significantly as farm owners struggled to hire enough domestic workers to tend to their crops. Between 2010 and 2020, the number of people in Georgia who were in the state via an H-2A visa grew from roughly 5,500 to 27,614, second only to Florida in the number of H-2A visa holders. By 2023, this number had grown to roughly 37,500. Under the system, the work sponsors are often contractors who recruit and oversee the migrant workers and negotiate a work contract with farm owners for their labor.

Some advocates for immigration reform, including President Teresa Romero of the United Farm Workers (UFW) labor union, argue that migrant workers involved in the H-2A visa program are often open to exploitation by the contractors. In a 2023 inspection done by the United States Department of Labor (DOL) in the Southeastern United States, the department found labor violations at 90 percent of the agricultural worksites that they visited. Additionally, the Center for Migrants' Rights advocacy group noted that, of 100 migrant workers they interviewed between 2019 and 2020, a quarter had admitted to paying illegal recruitment fees to recruiters. Additionally, according to Human Rights Watch, female migrant workers are especially susceptible to incidents of harassment and violence, including rape.

== Investigation ==
Beginning in 2016, several agencies within the federal government of the United States, following leads from the Coalition of Immokalee Workers, began to investigate the operations of agricultural organizations registered under Maria Leticia Patricio, a U.S. citizen who was the registered agent of ten different companies in Georgia. Operation Blooming Onion, named in reference to the blooming onion dish, was organized under the Organized Crime Drug Enforcement Task Force program and involved the Diplomatic Security Service, the Federal Bureau of Investigation, Homeland Security Investigations (HSI), the DOL, and the United States Postal Inspection Service, with HSI being the lead organization. Additional federal, state, and county-level agencies were also involved in the investigation, including the Georgia Bureau of Investigation and several sheriffs' departments.

=== Allegations ===
According to the federal agents, the investigation revealed that, starting since at least 2015, Patricio and several others had operated as a transnational criminal organization (TCO), based in South Georgia, that had engaged in multiple crimes related to the H-2A visa program. The investigators allege that the Patricio TCO submitted over 71,000 H-2A visa requests to the United States government and was granted thousands of visas. Using the visas, the TCO brought foreign nationals from Guatemala, Honduras, and Mexico, among other countries. Once in the United States, the investigators allege that the TCO abused and exploited these contract laborers, subjecting them to poor working and living conditions while leasing them out to work for farmers. According to the investigation, members of the TCO illegally withheld travel and identification documents from the workers and forced them to perform physically demanding work for little or no pay under threat of deportation or violence. Investigators stated that workers were physically intimidated and threatened with guns. Some were made to dig up onions with their bare hands and were paid as little as $0.20 ($0.24 in 2025) per bucket of onions, despite some workers being promised up to $12 per hour in wages. Additionally, some of the workers were charged unlawful fees for their food, housing, and transportation and were housed in crowded and unsanitary conditions.

At the work camps, the foreign nationals were subjected to overcrowding and unsanitary conditions, with limited access to food and drinking water and inadequate plumbing, leading to some raw sewage leaks. In some cases, the work camps consisted of mobile homes surrounded by electric fences. Workers were constantly threatened with murder, and investigators accuse the conspirators of attempted murder, in addition to the rape of one individual and kidnapping of five individuals. In several cases, workers were traded or sold to co-conspirators, including the sale of about 30 workers to a contractor in Indiana for $21,481. At least two workers died as a result of working conditions. In a 2021 press release, the United States Attorney's Office for the Southern District of Georgia referred to the conditions as "modern-day slavery".

According to the investigators, the alleged crimes took place in several jurisdictions in the United States, including the Middle District of Florida, the Middle, Northern, and Southern Districts of Georgia, and the Southern District of Texas, as well as in Guatemala, Honduras, and Mexico. In the Southern District of Georgia, the criminal activities were suspected to have occurred in the following counties: Atkinson, Bacon, Coffee, Tattnall, Toombs, and Ware. Federal investigators estimate that the TCO earned over $200 million ($238 million in 2025) through the scheme, which they laundered in different ways, including through the cash purchase of cashier's checks, houses, land, and vehicles. Additionally, members of the TCO gambled millions of dollars at the Seminole Hard Rock Hotel and Casino Tampa, which cooperated with the federal agents in their investigation.

== Legal proceedings ==
At 6 a.m. EST on November 17, 2021, more than 200 federal agents and other law enforcement officers assembled in the Southern District of Georgia to execute over 20 federal search warrants at multiple locations related to the investigation.

=== Indictments ===
On the morning of November 22, federal officials, including Acting U.S. Attorney for the Southern District of Georgia David H. Estes, held a press conference in Savannah, Georgia, to announce indictments against 24 individuals, including Patricio, on criminal charges of conspiracy. The indictments had been decided upon by a federal grand jury the previous month. As part of USA v. Patricio et al, all of the accused were charged with conspiracy to commit mail fraud, conspiracy to engage in forced labor, and conspiracy to commit money laundering. Additionally, Patricio and another individual were charged with multiple counts of committing mail fraud. Eleven individuals were also charged with several counts of forced labor, while three were also charged with tampering with a witness. The charge of witness tampering stems from late 2019, when federal authorities state that three of the accused individuals intimidated and attempted to persuade a witness to lie before the grand jury about the alleged criminal activities that the TCO had engaged in. Two of the accused are business owners, while the remainder are either recruiters or labor contractors. Only one of the accused is a farmer. By late 2021, all of Patricio's companies had been dissolved. The accused were arraigned on December 21 and January 6, 2022, at the federal courthouse in Waycross, Georgia. The accused individuals are charged with the following:

Accused	Charges					
Accused	Conspiracy to commit mail fraud	Mail fraud	Conspiracy to engage in forced labor	Forced labor	Conspiracy to commit money laundering	Tampering with a witness
Maria Leticia Patricio	Yes	Yes; 2 counts	Yes	No	Yes	No
Daniel Mendoza	Yes	No	Yes	No	Yes	No
Nery Rene Carrillo-Najarro	Yes	No	Yes	Yes; 14 counts	Yes	No
Antonio Chavez Ramos (aka Tony Chavez)	Yes	No	Yes	Yes; 4 counts	Yes	No
JC Longoria Castro	Yes	No	Yes	Yes; 4 counts	Yes	No
Victoria Chavez Hernandez	Yes	No	Yes	No	Yes	No
Enrique Duque Tovar	Yes	No	Yes	Yes; 9 counts	Yes	No
Jose Carmen Duque Tovar	Yes	No	Yes	Yes; 9 counts	Yes	No
Charles Michael King	Yes	No	Yes	No	Yes	No
Stanley Neal McGauley	Yes	No	Yes	No	Yes	No
Luis Alberto Martinez (aka Chino Martinez)	Yes	No	Yes	No	Yes	No
Delia Ibarra Rojas	Yes	No	Yes	Yes; 3 counts	Yes	No
Juana Ibarra Carrillo	Yes	No	Yes	No	Yes	No
Donna Michelle Rojas (aka Donna Lucio)	Yes	No	Yes	Yes; 3 counts	Yes	No
Margarita Rojas Cardenas (aka Maggie Cardenas)	Yes	No	Yes	Yes; 3 counts	Yes	Yes
Juan Francisco Alvarez Campos	Yes	No	Yes	No	Yes	No
Rosalvo Garcia Martinez (aka Chava Garcia)	Yes	No	Yes	No	Yes	Yes
Esther Ibarra Garcia	Yes	No	Yes	Yes; 3 counts	Yes	No
Rodolfo Martinez Maciel	Yes	No	Yes	Yes; 3 counts	Yes	No
Brett Donavan Bussey	Yes	Yes; 4 counts	Yes	No	Yes	Yes
Linda Jean Facundo	Yes	No	Yes	No	Yes	No
Gumara Canela	Yes	No	Yes	Yes; 14 counts	Yes	No
Daniel Merari Canela Diaz	Yes	No	Yes	No	Yes	No
Carla Yvonne Salinas	Yes	No	Yes	No	Yes	No

=== Legal outcomes ===
The Southern Poverty Law Center offered legal representation for several whistleblowers in the case, and the Georgia Legal Services Program took on several victims as clients. Prosecutors dropped their case against Rodolfo Martinez Maciel after learning that he had been murdered by decapitation in Mexico in September 2019.

On March 31, 2022, the U.S. Attorney's Office for the Southern District of Georgia stated in a press release that three of the accused individuals, Javier Sanchez Mendoza Jr., Aurelio Medina, and Yordon Velazquez Victoria, had pleaded guilty and been sentenced to multiple months in prison. Mendoza, who pleaded guilty to conspiracy to engage in forced labor, admitted that, between August 2018 and November 2019, he had been a leader in the scheme, overseeing operations in Glynn, Pierce, and Ware counties in Georgia. During that time, he had recruited over 500 workers from Central America, illegally charging them for H-2A visas and withholding their identification documentations. Additionally, prosecutors alleged that he had committed multiple acts of rape against one of the people he had misled. Mendoza was sentenced to 30 years in federal prison. Medina was sentenced to 64 months for charges of forced labor and Victoria was sentenced to 15 months for conspiracy. Additionally, both Mendoza and Medina are subject to possible deportation following their sentences, as both are Mexican citizens illegally living in the United States.

On March 15, 2023, Daniel Canela Diaz pled guilty and was sentenced in October 2023 to two years in prison, five years of supervised release, payment of $162,000 in restitution to seven victims, and deportation following his prison sentence. On May 17, Stanley Neal McGauley pled guilty to conspiracy to commit mail fraud and was sentenced to one year and one day in prison, followed by three years of supervised release. From July 2023 to February 2024, eight defendants entered into plea deals where they agreed to plead guilty to their charges. These were JC Longoria Castro, Charles Michael King, Rosalva Garcia Martinez, Esther Ibarra Garcia, Daniel Mendoza, Donna Michelle Roja, Antonio Chavez Ramos, and Gumara Camela. Their plea hearings were on February 27, 2024, at the Waycross Federal Courthouse. On March 1, several other defendants contested their charges at the same courthouse. The following month, Patricio filed court documents indicating that she intended to take her case to trial. However, on July 26, Patricio took a plea deal where she pled guilty to conspiracy to commit mail fraud. At the same hearing, Daniel Mendoza was sentenced to three years of probation and restitution payments of $86,787.24 for conspiracy to commit mail fraud, while Rosalva Martinez was sentenced to five years of probation and restitution payments of $8,457.26 for tampering with a witness.

== Aftermath ==
Operation Blooming Onion has been described by multiple sources as one of the largest law enforcement operations of its kind in United States history, and it was the first operation under a new directive from U.S. Immigration and Customs Enforcement (HSI's parent agency) that placed an emphasis on addressing exploitative conditions among migrant workers. According to Acting U.S. Attorney Estes, the operation "[freed] more than 100 individuals from the shackles of modern-day slavery and will hold accountable those who put them in chains". According to Savannah's ABC affiliate, WJCL, thousands more may have been affected by the TCO. In November 2022, USA Today reported that Georgia State Senator Russ Goodman's farm had employed a contractor whose house was searched as part of the search warrant investigations. However, the contractor was not indicted in the case, and Goodman said he was unaware of any issues, but was intending to investigate the matter.

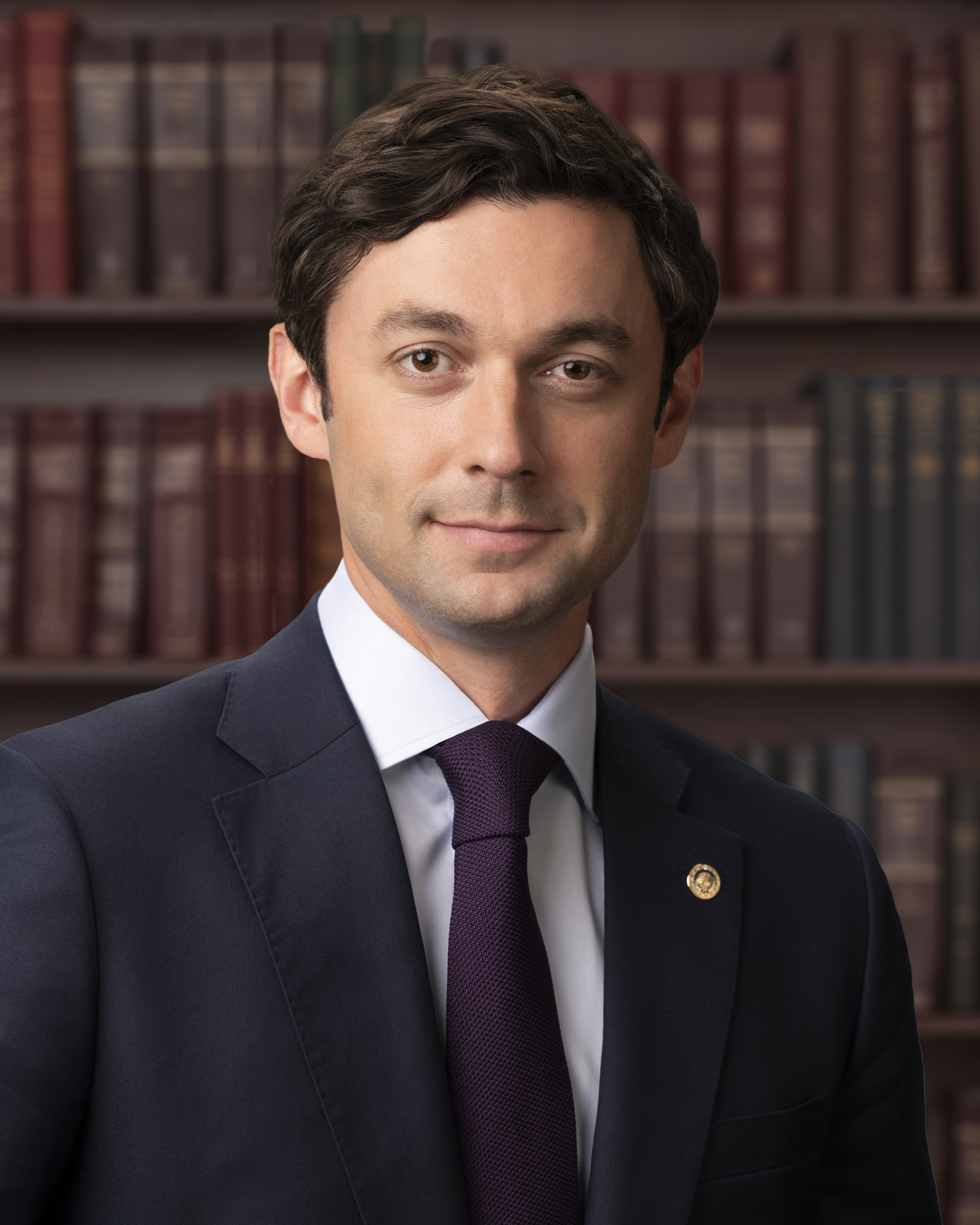
Senator Jon Ossoff of Georgia called for reform of the H-2A visa program following the operation.

In 2021, Charles Kuck, an immigration attorney from Georgia, commented that the case was "unusual, when we know that the conditions for workers that they described are not unusual. This is just people getting caught". Following the operation, as well as several other cases of people being indicted on human trafficking crimes related to H-2A visa holders, multiple news sources began to focus on perceived issues with the H-2A visa program and its misuse. Multiple farmworker advocacy groups have requested reforms of the system from President Joe Biden, and in a letter to the Cabinet of Joe Biden, Senator Jon Ossoff of Georgia said,

This crime, forced labor, physical abuse, sexual abuse and coercion is all too widespread, not just in Georgia, but nationally. And reform of the H-2A program is necessary. This is a federal guest worker program. It is totally unacceptable for there to be slavery in a federal guest worker program. And that's why I'm demanding answers from administration officials

In 2023, the Biden administration announced a streamlined path for migrants in the United States who were subject to exploitation to file for deportation relief, which would directly apply to those affected by the Patricio TCO. In the summer of 2024, a new rule from the DOL was set to go into effect that would have given H-2A visa holders more rights, including further prohibitions against sponsors confiscating their passports and allows them to invite people into their employer-owned housing. In August 2024, Judge Lisa Godbey Wood of the Southern District of Georgia blocked the new rule from going into effect in Georgia.

In 2023, journalist Shane Mitchell won two James Beard Foundation Awards for her story on the operation and the Vidalia onion industry in Georgia, "Blood Sweat & Tears", which was published in The Bitter Southerner.

=== Alleged bribery of Georgia Department of Labor employees ===
In a hearing on March 30, 2022, Special Agent Julio Lopez of the HSI told U.S. Assistant Attorney Tania D. Groover that the Patricio TCO had bribed employees of the Georgia Department of Labor (GDOL) in order to have them approve housing for the migrants they were exploiting. The following month, USA Today published a report stating that there may be ties between the GDOL and the Patricio TCO. Bussey, who had been indicted in the case, had been an employee for the GDOL until 2018, while Jorge Gomez, whose sister and nephew were both indicted in the case, was an employee at the time of the search warrant executions. His house was searched as part of the warrant executions. Within two weeks of USA Today's publication, he applied for disability retirement and left GDOL. While at GDOL, both Bussey and Gomez were directly responsible for inspecting farmworkers' housing. As of October 2022, a spokesperson for GDOL said they had not been contacted by any government agents regarding the bribery allegations.

== See also ==
- Human trafficking in the United States
  - Human trafficking in Georgia (U.S. state)
- Labor trafficking in the United States
