= Sunion =

Variety of sweet onion

The Sunion is a variety of sweet onion. It is bred to be tearless and non-pungent.

== Development ==
The Sunion was originally developed by Bayer. In the late 1980s, scientists started cross-breeding different strains of onions until they were eventually able to obtain bulbs with lachrymatory factor (LF) production levels several times lower than those of a normal onion, thus resulting in tearless, non-pungent bulbs.

== Commercial production ==
Sunions have been commercially available in the US since 2018. They were first grown in Nevada and Washington, with a season ranging from November through April.

In 2020, Spanish retailers introduced the Sunion to Europe. In January 2022, retailer Waitrose introduced the onion to the British market, where they were initially sold at 50p apiece, compared to 14p for a typical, non-tearless onion.

== Sensory testing ==
Sunions are marketed as tearless and were certified as so after testing by the Bayer Sensory Lab and Ohio State University Sensory Evaluation Center. They are also described as sweet and mild. Before its commercial launch, the Sunion went through a number of taste tests, including by consumers. It was preferred 80% of the time. A review published by The Washington Post confirmed that they were indeed tearless, but lamented their lack of flavor.
