= Crawford, Frazer & Co. =

American slave trading business (1863–1864)

Coordinates: 33.754°N 84.392°W

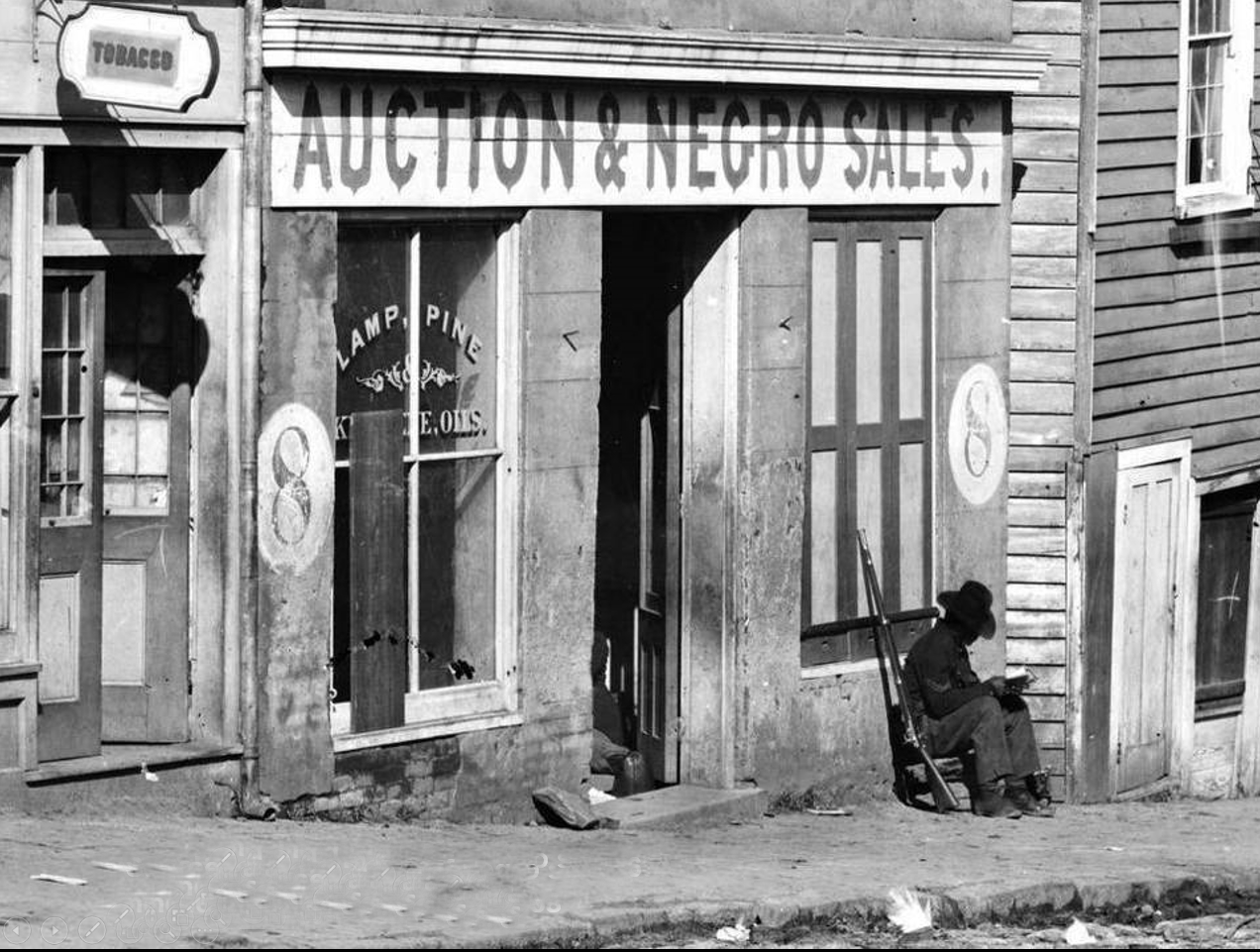
- Industry: Slave traders
- Founded: January 1863; 162 years ago in Atlanta
- Founders: Robert Crawford, Addison D. Frazer, Thomas Lafayette Frazer
- Defunct: April 1864
- Fate: Partnership dissolved

Crawford, Frazer & Co. was a slave-trading business located in Atlanta, Georgia, in the 1860s. The principals of Crawford, Frazer & Co. were Robert Crawford, Addison D. Frazer, and Thomas Lafayette Frazer. In company with a man named Robert Clarke, Crawford, Frazer & Co. may have been among "the largest of the city's slave brokers." The business opened in January 1863 and was dissolved in April 1864. All parties continued separately as negro traders, at another location in Atlanta (Crawford), and in Montgomery, Alabama (Frazers), until forced to cease operations due to the defeat of the Confederacy, concluding the American Civil War. Crawford, Frazer & Co. is remembered today because the company's negro mart appears in a notable photo of pre-burning Civil War Atlanta.

== History ==
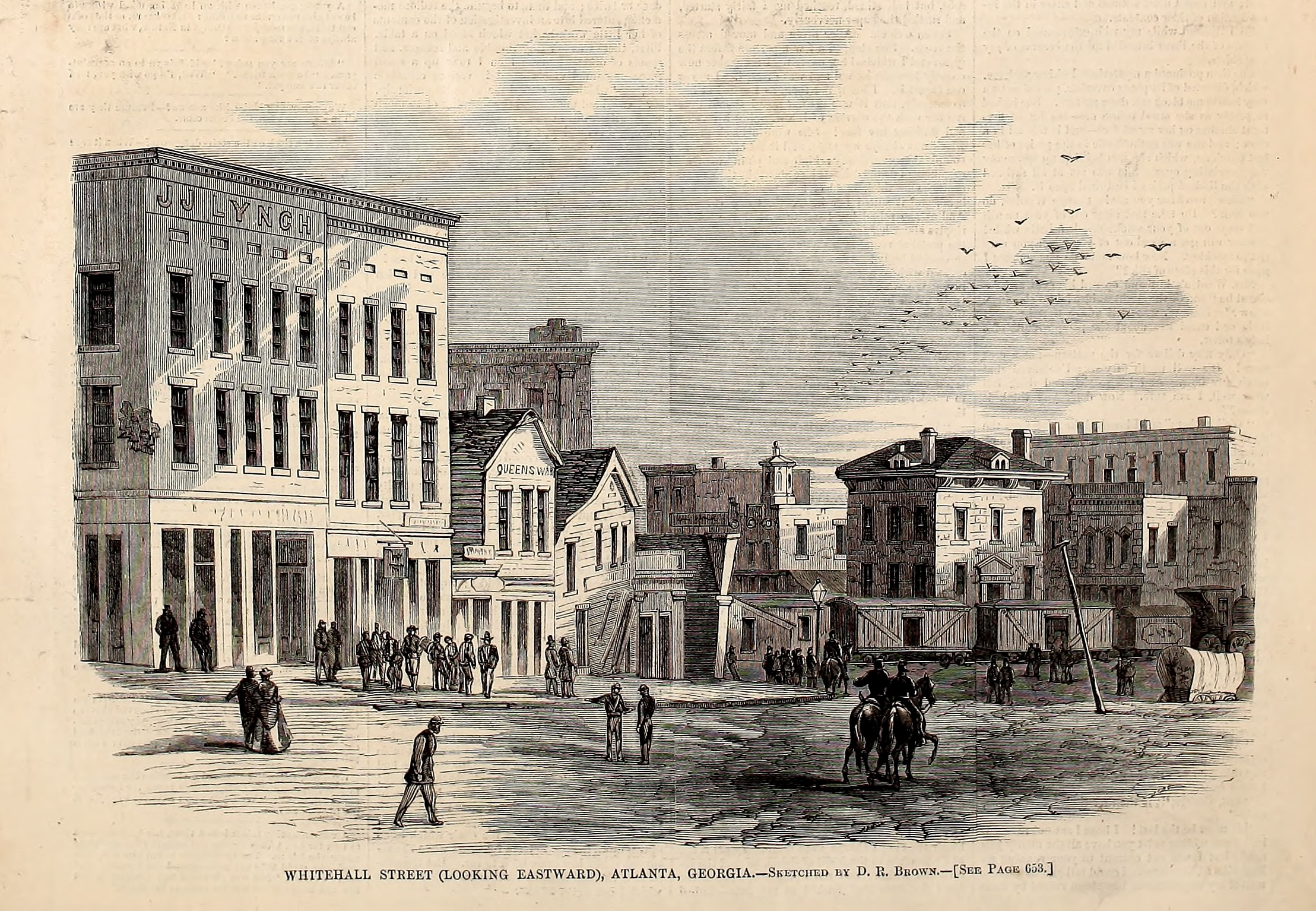
Wider angle of Whitehall Street (looking eastward) in Atlanta showing locomotive and cars on the Macon & Western rail line (sketched by D. R. Brown, Harper's Weekly, October 8, 1864)

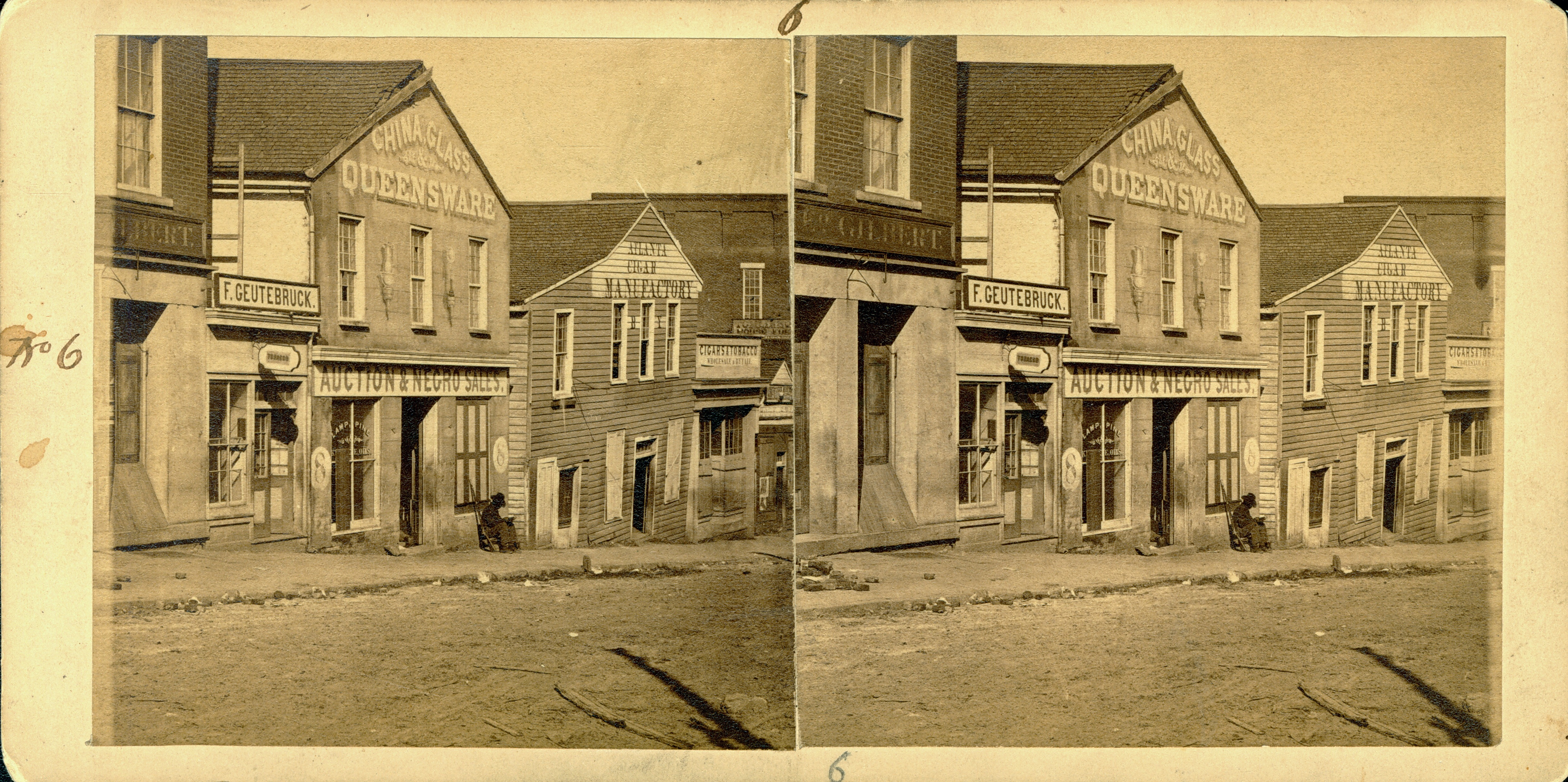
A note on the back of this stereographic view held by the Missouri Historical Society reads "No 6 View in Atlanta: Novr/64 - On Whitehall St. Ex negro-mart, used as U. S. Prov. Marshal's office"

On May 26, 1863, they advertised their business as commission merchants, auctioneers, and dealers in negroes in the Southern Confederacy newspaper, adding, "Our Negro Yard and Lock Up, at No. 8, [is] both safe and comfortable. Dealers and other parties will find us prepared to feed and lodge well, and from experiences in the business since our boyhood, to handle the negro properly." The Crawford, Frazer & Co. auction room and, to the rear, slave pen, was located at 8 Whitehall Street, between Alabama and Hunter Streets, immediately adjacent to the Macon & Western Railroad line. The site is now across the street from the Five Points station of the MARTA transit system, on the Underground Atlanta plaza. The Crawford, Frazer & Co. stand was across from the offices of the Atlanta Intelligencer newspaper, which talked up their slave business, claiming in 1863 that Atlanta had overtaken Macon, Georgia, as a regional market for slaves and that it was fast approaching the scale of Richmond, Virginia.

The Atlanta History Center holds a Crawford, Frazer & Co. receipt dated May 2, 1863, for the sale of "Harry about 34 & Hannah 30" to John P. Hulst. The sale price was $3,600 for the pair, likely paid in Confederate currency. Another such receipt is for Ben, a 21-year-old who sold for $3,200. In September 1863, Crawford, Frazer & Co. donated $1,000 to a fund for the care of the Confederate wounded from the Battle of Chickamauga.

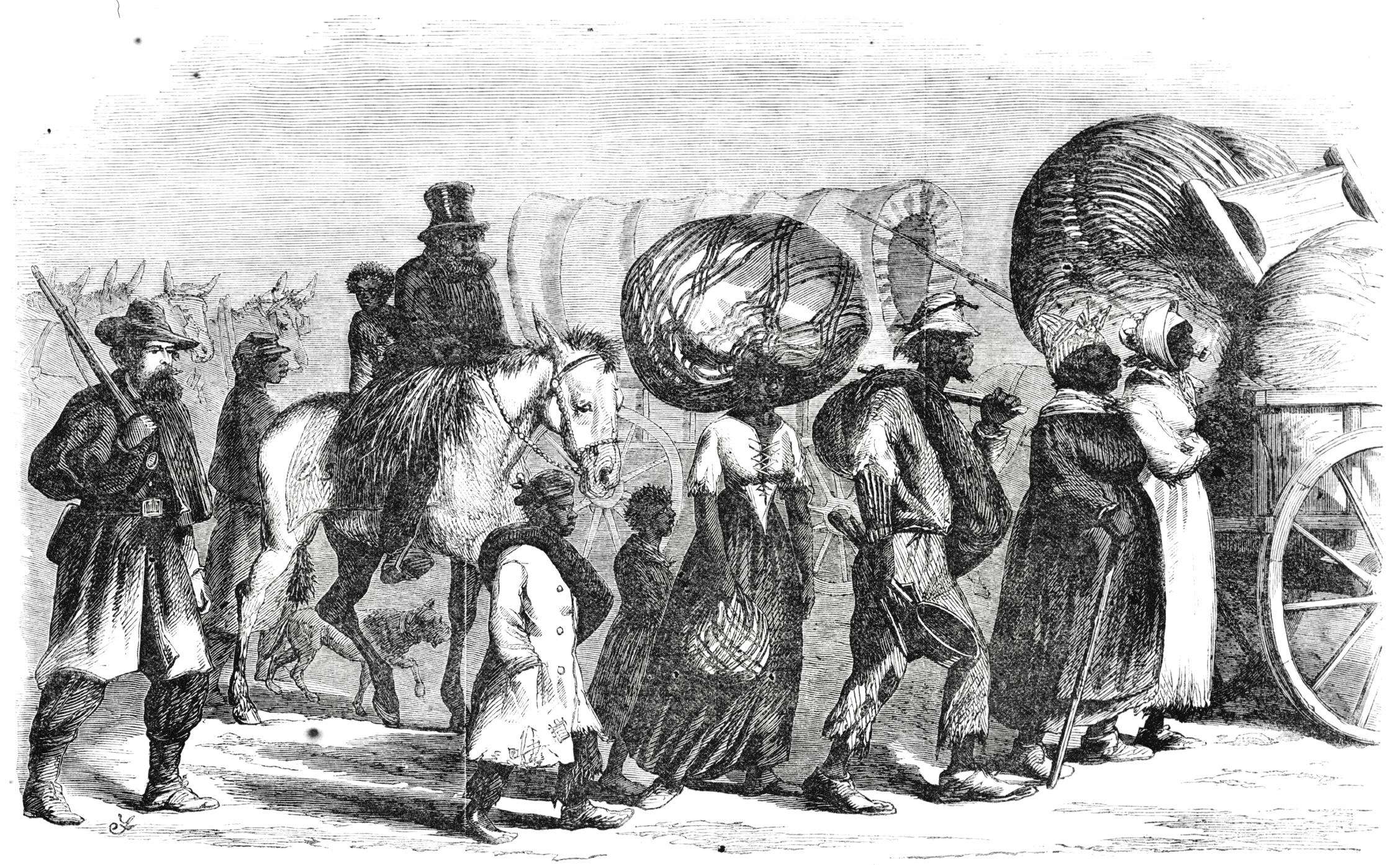
Sherman may not have employed U.S. Colored Troops in combat (he has been described as "one of the least sensitive toward blacks of all the supreme Federal commanders"), but the line of Sherman's march through Georgia was nonetheless accompanied by thousands of contrabands escaping slavery once and for all (unidentified war artist "F", Frank Leslie's Illustrated News, March 18, 1865)

George N. Barnard photographed several business buildings along Whitehall, including the Crawford, Frazer & Co. storefront, in autumn 1864, after General William T. Sherman had captured the city, but before it burned.

Stephen Berry in Lens of War argues that the famous photograph of a corporal in the U.S. Colored Troops reading in front of the building was most likely posed, as there were no USCT units with Sherman (he didn't much like "Negroes" and wrote a letter to Henry Halleck to that effect the week the photo was taken), and Berry argues that the figure visible just inside the door was likely told to move out of frame for the sake of the image. Berry notes that there are a great deal more questions than answers about the photo, including the identity of the reading man and what was Barnard's intent (if he indeed posed the image), but also argues that even without these factual certainties, the image draws its power from juxtaposition of the reading man and the visibly derelict business, now deprived of its original purpose as a depot for buying and selling people: "Those days are over."

== See also ==
- Atlanta campaign
- Contrabands (American Civil War)
- African Americans in Atlanta
- List of Georgia slave traders
- History of slavery in Georgia
