= Bermuda onion =

Variety of sweet onion associated with the island of Bermuda

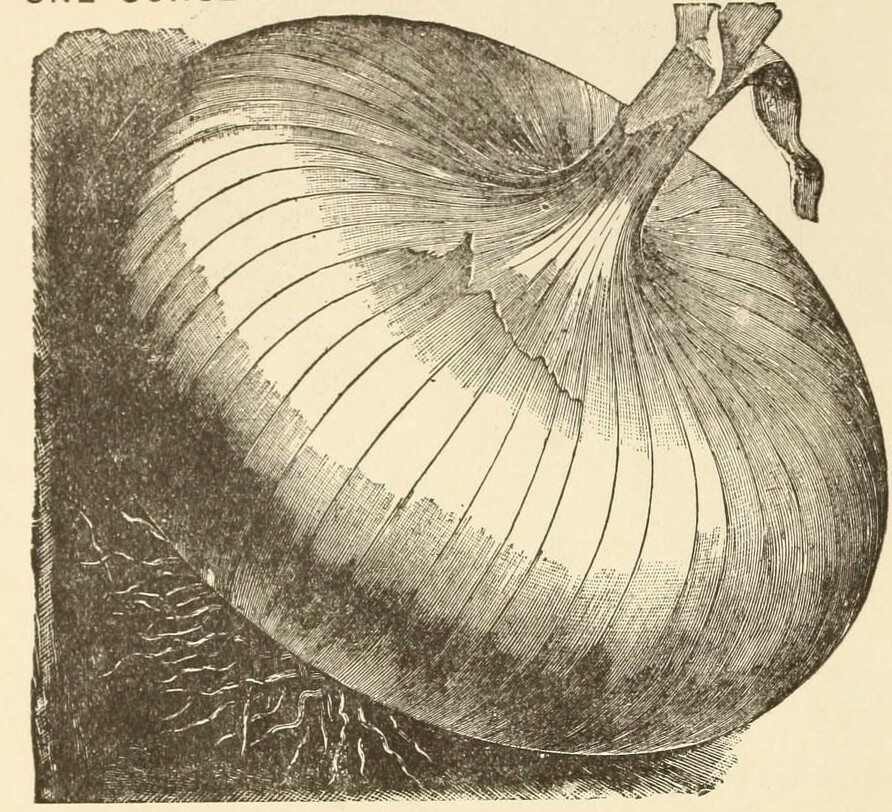
From a 1902 seed catalogue

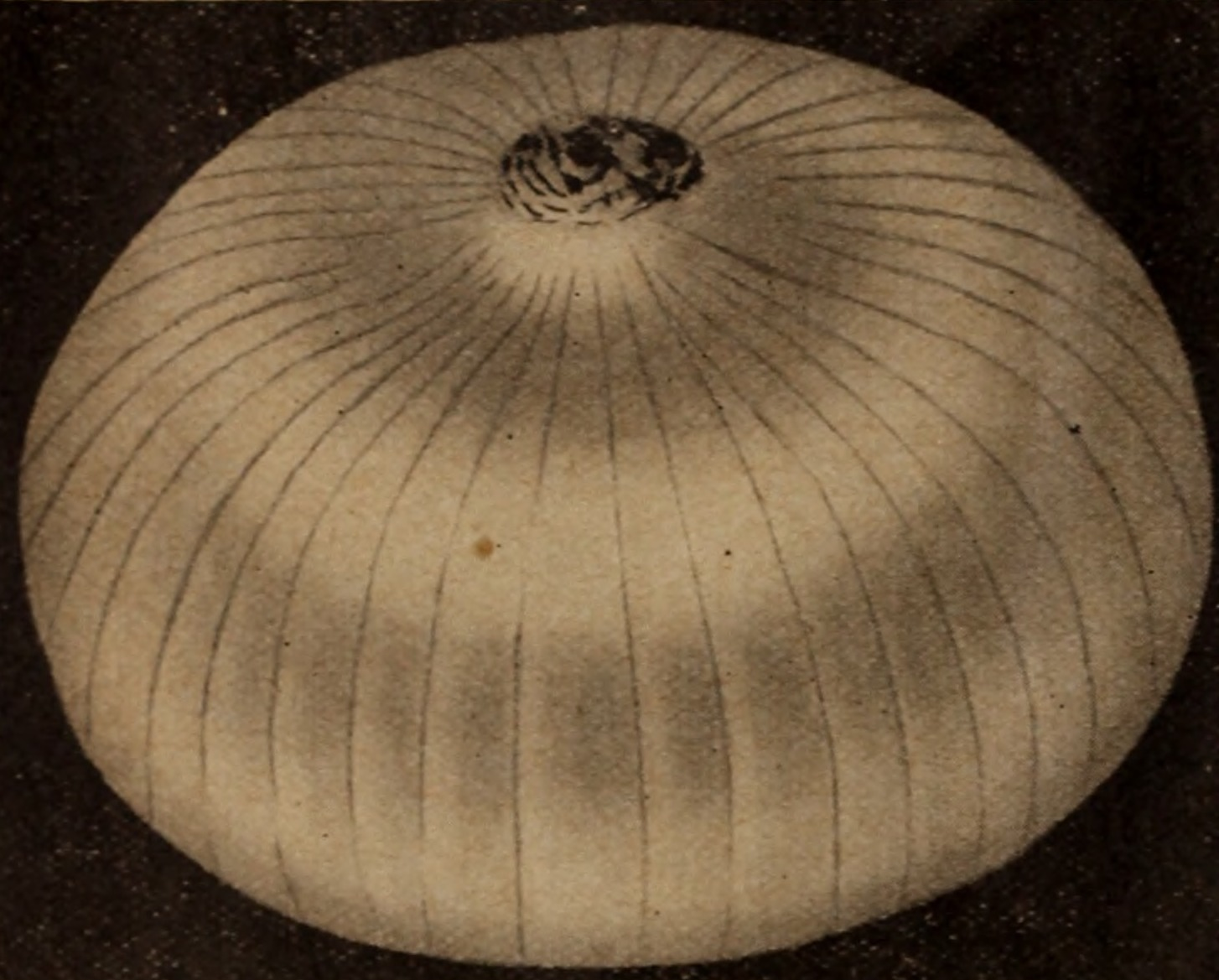
From a 1918 seed catalogue

Bermuda onions are a variety of sweet onion associated with the island of Bermuda. They are large and relatively flat with a thin skin that makes them rather perishable. First grown in Bermuda in 1616–1617, they became a staple crop and, by the mid-19th century, a major export. The onion became a symbol of the island and was described by Mark Twain as "her jewel, her gem of gems". The variety began to be grown in the southern United States and by 1920 was the only onion grown in Texas. American production and the effects of the First World War led to a decline in international demand for onions from Bermuda, and the island ceased exporting them in 1946.

== Description ==
The Bermuda onion is large and flat. It is white or yellow in colour and has a mild, sweet taste. It is similar in taste and appearance to white Spanish and Portuguese onions. The Bermuda onion is a very fast growing variety; it does not form a thick outer skin and so perishes very quickly, often after only a few weeks in storage. Yields of up to 35,000 pounds (16,000 kg) per acre are possible though usual yields of 10,000–12,000 pounds (4,500–5,400 kg) were recorded in 1937.

== History ==
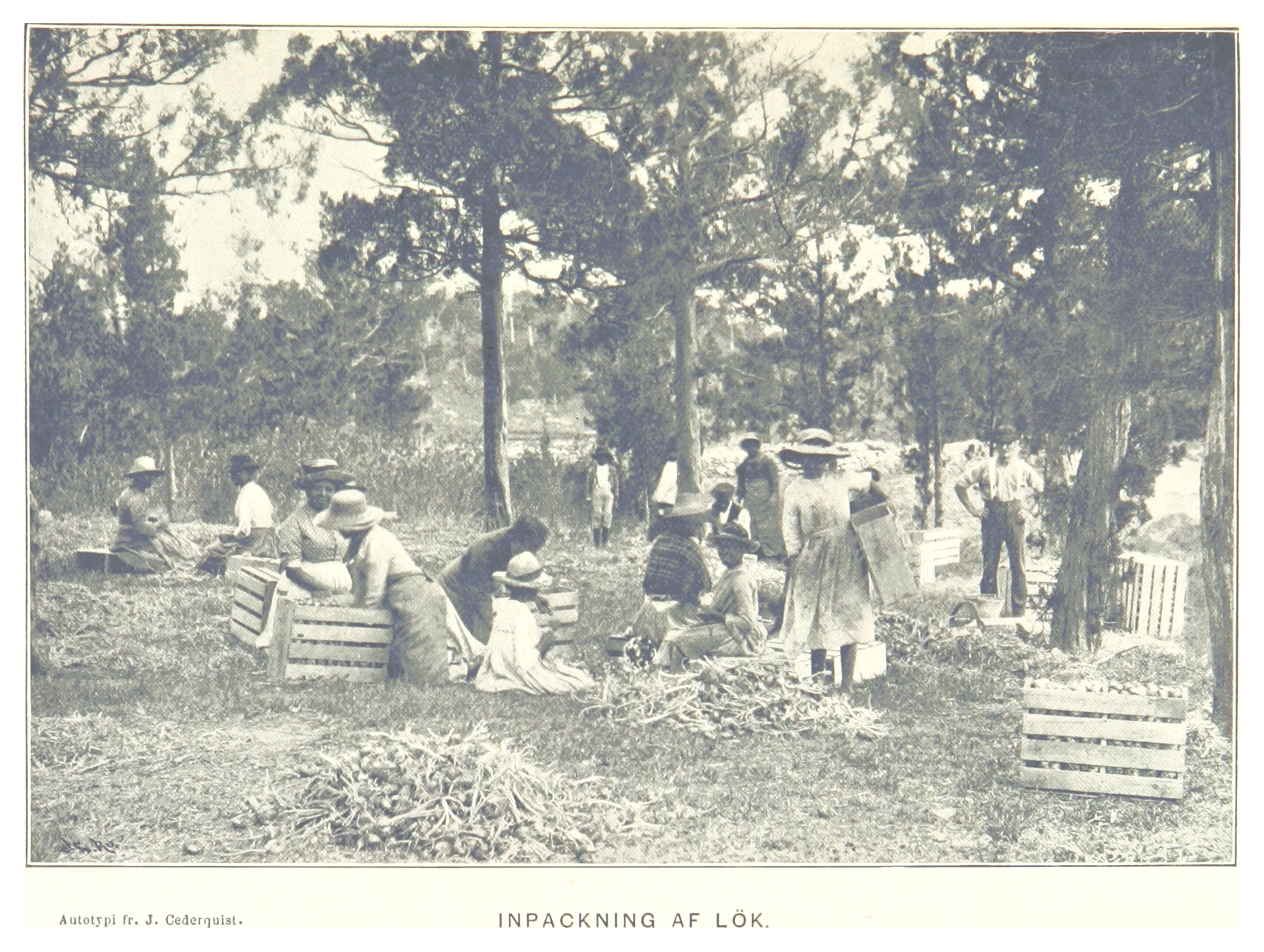
Packing onion boxes in Bermuda, 1895

This onion was first grown on Bermuda in 1616; it was found to thrive in the climate and became a staple crop of the island. It was first exported to the United States in 1847 and in the 19th century became a major export with weekly shipments sometimes exceeding 30,000 boxes. The Bermuda onion was also exported to the United Kingdom. The agricultural workforce in this period was boosted by the arrival of Portuguese immigrants. Bermuda became so closely associated with the vegetable that it became known as "the onion patch" and its inhabitants continue to be nicknamed "onions". 19th-century US author Mark Twain noted "The onion is the pride and joy of Bermuda. It is her jewel, her gem of gems. In her conversation, her pulpit, her literature, it is her most frequent and eloquent figure". Several locations on the island are named for the onion and it remains a popular local symbol; a day of Bermuda's heritage month is dedicated to the onion. It is often consumed in soups or as an ingredient in fish chowder.

A 1910 issue of the Farmers' Bulletin notes that T. C. Nye of Laredo, Texas, was perhaps the first to successfully grow the Bermuda onion in the United States. In the US the onion was grown as a winter crop, in which use it requires a mild climate as, though it can survive freezing conditions, its growth is hampered by the cold. By 1910 some 5,000–7,000 acres (2,000–2,800 ha) were in cultivation in southern Texas with further plantations in southern Florida and southern California. The success of the crop in the US, the impact of the First World War (1914–1918) and the post-war imposition of US import taxes led to a decline in exports from Bermuda.

By 1920, the Bermuda onion was almost the sole onion grown in Texas, being sown in September, transplanted November to January and harvested from March through April. By 1922 it was also being successfully grown in the Canary Islands, with an output of 174,000 US bushels (6,100,000 L; 1,390,000 US dry gal; 1,350,000 imp gal) being recorded that year. A 1930s campaign by the Bermuda Trade Development Board, emphasising the unique taste of onions grown on Bermuda, failed to revive the trade and exports ceased in 1946.

By the 1990s the product marketed in the US as a Bermuda onion was actually a different variety and the true Bermuda onion was no longer available. Most were by then imported from Mexico.
