= Leonard M. Pike =

American agricultural scientist (1940–2019)

Leonard M. Pike (February 1, 1940 – January 12, 2019) was an American agricultural scientist who established the Vegetable and Fruit Improvement Center at Texas A&M University in 1992 and created the 1015 sweet onion and the BetaSweet maroon carrot.

Pike was born and raised in Arkansas. He attended the University of Arkansas, where he received a master's degree in 1964. Three years later, he was granted a Ph.D. from Michigan State University. Shortly after graduation, he joined the faculty at Texas A&M University.

At A&M, Pike focused his research on cucumbers, onions, and carrots, using selective cross-breeding techniques to create new or hardier varieties. His research led to cucumbers that would ripen on the vine simultaneously, and that were stronger and better able to survive the machine picking process. He then created a variety of seedless cucumber.

In 1977, Texas onion growers asked him to help them to create a variety of onion that would better withstand disease and that they would be able to harvest in winter, a typically barren time of year for the Texas onion crops. Over the next four years, Pike was able to create hardier versions. He then turned his focus to creating single-centered onions, which would be easier to use to make onion rings. Pike and his graduate students tested their onions by frying them up as onion rings. The research results in the 1015 variety of sweet onions, which became one of the most popular varieties of onion sold in the United States. Pike's onion was named the official Texas state vegetable in 1997 and is estimated to provide $350 million per year to the Texas economy, as of 2013. The onion became a staple in the blooming onions sold by Outback Steakhouse. The Outback restaurant in College Station, Texas hung a picture of Pike on the wall to thank him for his efforts. For his creation of the 1015 onion, Pike won the Southwest Man of the Year in Agriculture Award.

In 1992, Pike founded the Vegetable and Fruit Improvement Center at Texas A&M. He served as the director of the center until his retirement in 2006. The center focused on developing foods that are healthier for humans, not just prettier or stronger and often partnered with the M.D. Anderson Cancer Center in Houston, Texas to determine which varieties had more cancer-fighting compounds. One of the results was the BetaSweet carrot, a maroon carrot (to match the Texas A&M school color) which has fifty percent more beta-carotene than a typical carrot.
