= Human trafficking in Georgia (U.S. state) =

Human trafficking in Georgia is the illegal trade of human beings for the purposes of reproductive slavery, commercial sexual exploitation, and forced labor as it occurs in the US state of Georgia, and it is widely recognized as a modern-day form of slavery. Human trafficking includes "the recruitment, transportation, transfer, harboring or receipt of persons by means of threat or use of force or other forms of coercion, of abduction, of fraud, of deception, of the abuse of power, or of a position of vulnerability or of the giving or receiving of payments or benefits to achieve the consent of a person having control over another person, for the purpose of exploitation. Exploitation shall include, at a minimum, the exploitation of prostitution of others or other forms of sexual exploitation, forced labor services, slavery or practices similar to slavery, servitude or the removal of organs."

== History ==
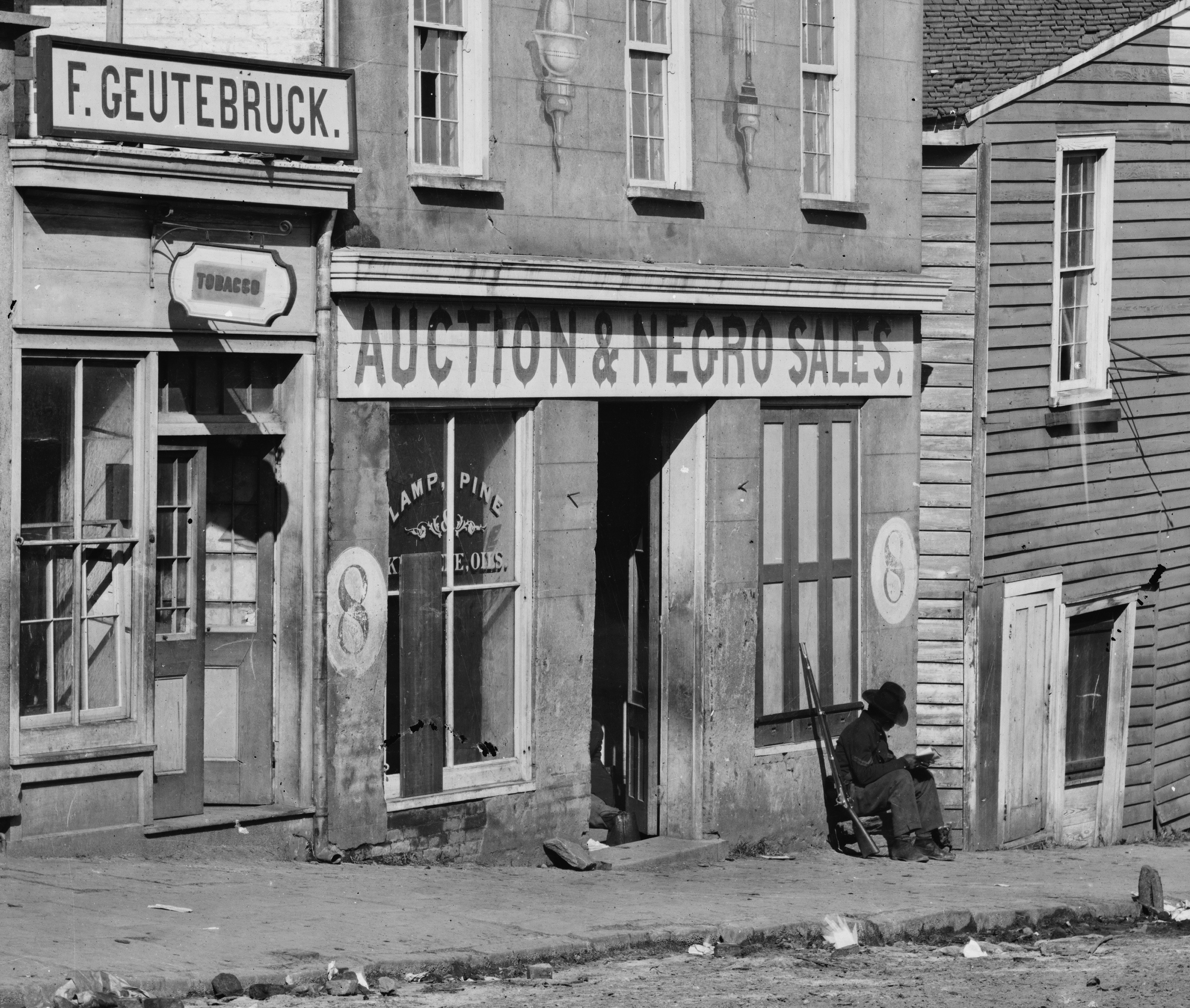
Slave trading in Atlanta

Human trafficking in the form of slavery is known to have been practiced by the original or earliest-known inhabitants of the future colony and state of Georgia, for centuries prior to European colonization. During the colonial era, the practice of Indian slavery in Georgia soon became surpassed by industrial-scale plantation slavery. While slavery technically became illegal in Georgia after the ratification of the 13th Amendment, slavery continued to thrive legally under the peonage system and aggressive penal labor.

== Laws ==
Georgia law OCGA 16-5-46 prohibits the trafficking of persons for labor or sexual servitude with a more severe penalty for trafficking minors.

On April 2, 2015, a new law passed called the SB8 and SR7. Under this law convicted traffickers will register as sex offenders and pay into a state fund called New Safe Harbor to help victims of sex trafficking with physical, mental health, education, job training and legal help.

HB 200 law went into effect on July 1, 2011. The law is harsher when it involves minors and can be up to a twenty-year prison sentence and a $100,000 fine. Another major step is that the age of consent, which is sixteen, or lack of knowledge of the victim's age is no longer a valid defense.

== Sex trafficking in Atlanta ==
Atlanta is a major transportation hub for trafficking young girls from southern countries and is one of the fourteen U.S. cities with the highest levels of child sex trafficking.

In 2007, the sex trade generated $290 million (~$421 million in 2024) in Atlanta. This number derives from the study "Estimating the Size and Structure of the Underground Commercial Sex Economy in Eight Major US Cities" by Urban institute, with 18 interviews (pg. 121) conducted in Atlanta, and includes "prostitutes, massage parlors, and brothels" with both "pimp controlled" individuals and "non-pimp controlled" (pg. 122). In the study, human trafficking is defined in the section: "Background on the Prevalence of Human Trafficking in the United States" as "any sex act in exchange for which anything of value is given to or received by any person (e.g., prostitution)." (pg. 7).

Craigslist is a major medium for the advertisement for sex and the site is known to get three times as many hits as other sites.

"The same ready access to commercial air and ground routes that draws businesses and travelers to Atlanta also entices criminals engaged in human trafficking." There are numerous events and conventions in Atlanta that bring many people to the city which also exemplifies the issue.

== Organizations ==
Out Of Darkness is an organization that is against sex trafficking which is located in Atlanta Georgia; Out of Darkness falls under the section 501(c) (3). Their "mission is to reach, rescue and restore all victims of commercial sexual exploitation, that the glory of God may be known."

BeLoved Atlanta is an organization that focuses on the "community of women who have survived trafficking, prostitution and addiction". BeLoved Atlanta will provide a residential home to adult women who were personally affected by sexual exploitation, they are able to provide their services to residents for up to two years.

End It "is a coalition of leading organization in the world to fight for freedom". Their mission is to shine a light on all forms of slavery. End it "Partners are doing the work, on the ground, every day, to bring AWARENESS, PREVENTION, RESCUE, and RESTORATION."

Not For Sale is about protecting individuals from modern day slavery and human trafficking. Not For Sale started in Berkeley California, and is now located in 15 other states. They provide safety, job-training, and life skills, along with many other outlets.

== Cases of human trafficking ==
=== human trafficking in Athens-Clarke County ===
On March 19, 2016, Athens-Clarke County Police arrested two men at the Days Inn on North Finley Street for human trafficking. The police found a missing 16-year-old girl from New York inside the hotel. The men were charged with armed robbery with a gun, pimping a person under 18 years of age and trafficking commercial sex acts.

=== Sex trafficking in Gwinnett ===
On October 13, 2016, police arrested two cases of sex trafficking at Horizon Inn and Suites, Room 239, in Gwinnett. Both victims came into contact with Gwinnett County police at the Dawson Boulevard outside Norcross. Both 911 calls were made because residents of the hotel heard a woman being beaten. One of the victims boyfriend's, Betric Quintavious Walton, 25 was not at the scene but when the victim, 22 years old, was questioned by police she was hesitant to share info and then broke down saying she was scared to call the cops saying he said he would do something to her family if she did. The cop agreed to take her to the Doraville MARTA Station for her sister to pick her up. As they were pulling out of the parking lot, they saw a woman wearing tight jean shorts knocking on the door of Room 239. The victim told the cop she met Walton three years ago after having troubles with her mother at home. She gave him half the money she made working for him. The officer gave the woman phone numbers for Georgia Cares and Street Grace Ministries, organizations that help victims of sex trafficking. He mentioned that they could get her a medical exam and a place to stay.

=== Operation Cross Country X ===
On October 13, 2016, 60 people were arrested in Metro Atlanta for international sex trafficking and prostitution, and 82 minors were rescued. This operation took place at hotels, truck stops, street corners, and other locations. The Metro Atlanta Child Exploitation Task Force assisted the FBI. They rescued one juvenile from trafficking, executed two search warrants, and confiscated seven firearms. More arrests took place in the surrounding area with five people arrested in Alpharetta, one person in Dekalb, four in Dunwoody, two in Gwinnett County, two people in Marietta, five people in the Athens area, and one person in Augusta

- Sex traffickers arrested:
  - Amanda McConnell, 39, arrested by Alpharetta police
  - Kevin Lashawn Adams, 37, arrested by DeKalb police
  - Hadrian Crichlow, 34, arrested by DeKalb police
  - Shannon Mussa, 24, arrested by Alpharetta police
  - Latoya Tamara Taylor, 33, arrested by Cobb police
  - Sharnece Joyner, 24, arrested by Marietta police
  - Kelvin Howard, 60, arrested by Clayton police
  - Christopher J. Pudwill, 30, arrested by Perry police
  - Billy Dewayne Denson, 40, arrested by Perry police

=== Bladimir Moreno and Forced-labor Case ===
From 2015 to 2017, Bladimir Moreno, owner of Los Villatoros Harvesting LLC, ran a racketeering-style forced-labor scheme using H-2A agricultural visas, across several U.S. states, including Florida, Kentucky, Indiana, Georgia, and North Carolina. He charged inflated recruitment fees, confiscated passports, imposed debt burdens, housed workers in crowded unsanitary conditions, and threatened them with deportation if they refused. In 2022 he pleaded guilty to RICO and forced-labor conspiracy, and was sentenced to 118 months in federal prison, plus over US$175,000 restitution.

== Statistics ==
- Atlanta had the largest sex trade between 2003 and 2007 and 2018.
- In 2012, the National Human Trafficking Resource Center received 446 calls from Georgia, 103 of which were classified as high-risk
- In 2023, Atlanta ranked second only behind Washington, D.C. in human trafficking
- The average age of a child being sex trafficked is between 12 and 14 years old
- 5,000 girls are at-risk of being sex trafficked in Georgia
- Each month, 12,400 men Georgia pay for sex with a young and 7,200 of them end up exploiting an adolescent female
- Atlanta has the highest number of trafficked Hispanic females in the nation
- On average, 100 juvenile girls are exploited each night in Georgia
- Around 65% of men who buy sex with young females do so in and around suburban and metro Atlanta with 9% near the airport
- According to the Human Trafficking Hotline of Georgia, in 2016 there has been 507 calls, in 2015 there were 641 calls, and in 2013 there were 599 calls about human trafficking
- Approximately 374 girls are commercially sexually exploited monthly in Georgia
- According to the National Human Trafficking Human Resource Center the number of human trafficking cases in Georgia increased by 41 between 2014 and 2015

== See also ==
- Operation Blooming Onion
