= Vidalia onion =

Onion grown in the US state of Georgia

- Vidalia onions
- Species: Allium cepa
- Cultivar: Granex
- Origin: United States

A Vidalia onion (/vaɪˈdeɪliə/) is one of several varieties of sweet onion grown in a production area defined by law of the U.S. state of Georgia since 1986 and the United States Code of Federal Regulations (CFR). Varieties include the hybrid Yellow Granex, varieties of Granex parentage, and similar varieties as recommended by the Vidalia Onion Committee and approved by the U.S. Secretary of Agriculture.

The onions are named after Vidalia, Georgia, where they have been historically grown. The cultivation of Vidalia onions started in the early 1930s. The Granex and related varieties are sweeter than other onions, but the unusual sweetness of Vidalia onions is due to the low amount of sulfur in the soil in which Vidalia onions are grown.

The Vidalia onion was named Georgia's official state vegetable in 1990.

== Legislation ==
Georgia's state legislature passed the "Vidalia Onion Act of 1986" which authorizes a trademark for "Vidalia Onions" and limits production to these areas of the state as defined by the Georgia Commissioner of Agriculture:

- The entirety of these thirteen counties: Appling, Bacon, Bulloch, Candler, Emanuel, Evans, Jeff Davis, Montgomery, Tattnall, Telfair, Toombs, Treutlen, and Wheeler.
- Portions of these seven counties: Dodge, Jenkins, Laurens, Long, Pierce, Screven, and Wayne.

Since Georgia statutes have no legally binding effect outside Georgia, producers and handlers of Vidalia onions, meeting the standards defined by Georgia law, requested, and the United States Department of Agriculture promulgated, a Federal Marketing Order which defined the production area as a matter of United States federal law.
