= Sweet onion =

Variety of onion lacking pungency

Sweet onions, raw
Nutritional value per 100 g (3.5 oz)
- Energy: 133 kJ (32 kcal)
- Carbohydrates: 7.55 g
- Sugars: 5.02
- Dietary fiber: 0.9 g
- Fat: 0.08 g
- Protein: 0.8 g
Vitamins and minerals
Vitamins	Quantity %DV^{†}
Thiamine (B1)	3% 0.041 mg
Niacin (B3)	1% 0.133 mg
Pantothenic acid (B5)	2% 0.098 mg
Vitamin B6	8% 0.13 mg
Folate (B9)	6% 23 μg
Vitamin C	5% 4.8 mg
Minerals	Quantity %DV^{†}
Calcium	2% 20 mg
Iron	1% 0.26 mg
Magnesium	2% 9 mg
Manganese	3% 0.076 mg
Phosphorus	2% 27 mg
Potassium	4% 119 mg
Sodium	0% 8 mg
Zinc	1% 0.13 mg
- National Nutrient Database for Standard Reference
- ^{†}Percentages estimated using US recommendations for adults, except for potassium, which is estimated based on expert recommendation from the National Academies.

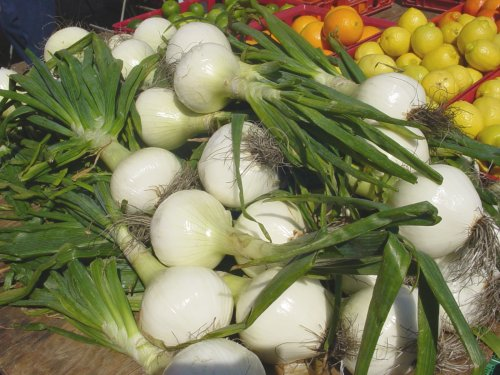
Sweet onions

A sweet onion is a variety of onion that is not pungent. Their mildness is attributable to their low sulfur content and high water content when compared to other onion varieties.

== Bermuda onions ==
The Bermuda onion is a variety of sweet onion grown on the island of Bermuda. The seeds were originally imported from the Canary Islands before 1888. Onion export to the United States became such a prominent feature of Bermudian life, the Bermudians started calling themselves onions. Sweet onions from Texas largely displaced the Bermuda variety.

== In Europe ==
In Europe, Oignon doux des Cévennes, Cipolla Rossa di Tropea Calabria, and Cebolla Dulce de Fuentes are well-known sweet onions. The Oignon doux des Cévennes from Cévennes in the southeast of France and the Cipolla Rossa di Tropea Calabria from Tropea, Calabria in southern Italy have PDO status. The Cebolla Dulce de Fuentes is an open variety originally from Zaragoza province in northeast Spain, and traditionally grown by producers there.

== In the United States ==
United States sweet onions were planted in several places during the early twentieth century.

Vidalia onions were first grown near Vidalia, Georgia, in the early 1930s. Today, the name refers to onions grown in a 20-county production region in the state of Georgia as defined by both Georgia state statute and by the U.S. Code of Federal Regulations.

South Texas acquired what is known as the 1015 onion in the early 1980s, from Dr. Leonard M. Pike, a horticulture professor at Texas A&M University. 1015 onions are named for their optimum planting date, October 15. Grown only in the Rio Grande Valley of South Texas, this large, prized onion was developed after ten years of extensive research and testing and a million dollars in cost. As a result, Texas had a mild, very sweet onion with the nickname "Million Dollar Baby". Onions are Texas's leading vegetable crop. The state produces mostly sweet yellow varieties. The sweet onion was adopted as Texas's official state onion in 1997.

The Walla Walla sweet onion is named for Walla Walla County, Washington, where it is grown. Its development began around 1900 when Peter Pieri, a French soldier who settled in the area, brought sweet onion seed from the island of Corsica with him to the Walla Walla Valley. This sweet onion was developed from Pieri's initial planting of Corsican onions by continually selecting and reseeding the sweetest, largest, roundest onions from each year's crop. It is the designated vegetable of Washington State. Gov. Christine Gregoire signed the "onion bill" in 2007 to make it the state's official vegetable.

=== Other U.S. varieties ===
- Imperial Valley Sweets come from the Imperial Valley in southern California. This is one of the leading growing areas for sweet onions, although they are available only from late April through June.
- The Carzalia Sweet onion is a variety of sweet onion grown by Carzalia Valley Produce in Columbus, New Mexico.
- The Sunbrero (Texas) Sweet Onion is grown in Texas and distributed by Sweet Onion Trading Company, Melbourne, Florida.
- The Sweetie Sweet is a variety of sweet onion grown in the Mason Valley in Yerington, Nevada. The Sweetie Sweet onion can be found in marketplaces September through the end of January.
- The Glennville sweet onion is grown in Tattnall County, in Glennville, Georgia.
- Mattamuskeet Sweets are a type of sweet onion grown in Eastern North Carolina, especially in eastern Beaufort and Hyde Counties. This particular variety is a popular choice for cooking and consumption amongst residents of coastal Carolina, and is named for Lake Mattamuskeet in central Hyde County.
- Maui onions are one of the smaller varieties of onions grown on the Hawaiian island of Maui. They are trademarked "Kula-grown" onions.
- Pecos onions are sweet onions grown in the Pecos Valley in the state of Texas.
