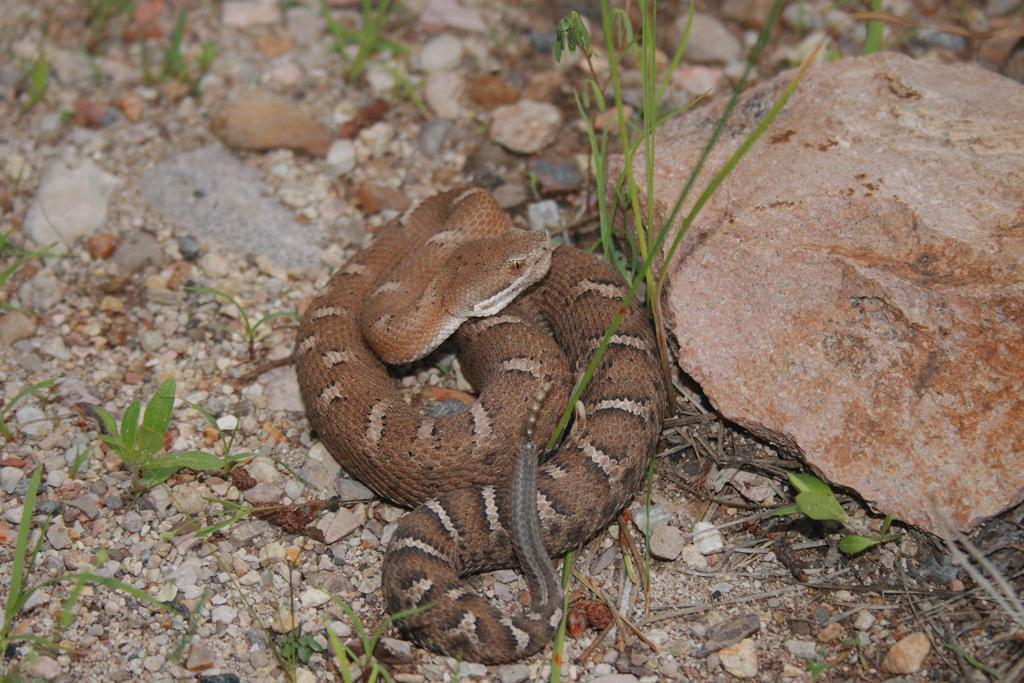

Scientific classification
- Kingdom: Animalia
- Phylum: Chordata
- Class: Reptilia
- Order: Squamata
- Suborder: Serpentes
- Family: Viperidae
- Genus: Crotalus
- Species: C. willardi
- Subspecies: C. w. silus

Trinomial name
- Crotalus willardi silus Klauber, 1949

= Crotalus willardi silus =

Subspecies of ridge-nosed rattlesnake from the Americas

Crotalus willardi silus, the Western Chihuahuan ridge-nosed rattlesnake, is a subspecies of ridge-nosed rattlesnake native to Mexico and the USA. As with all rattlesnakes, it is venomous.

== Description ==
Crotalus willardi silus is recognisable as it has less conspicuous markings than its sister subspecies. Its head is brown with irregular dark spots, it has a dark ocular band starting dark brown at the corner of the eyes and fades to grey as it reaches the end of the supralabials and the front of the head is usually grey. It lacks the facial markings seen in other subspecies of C. willardi.

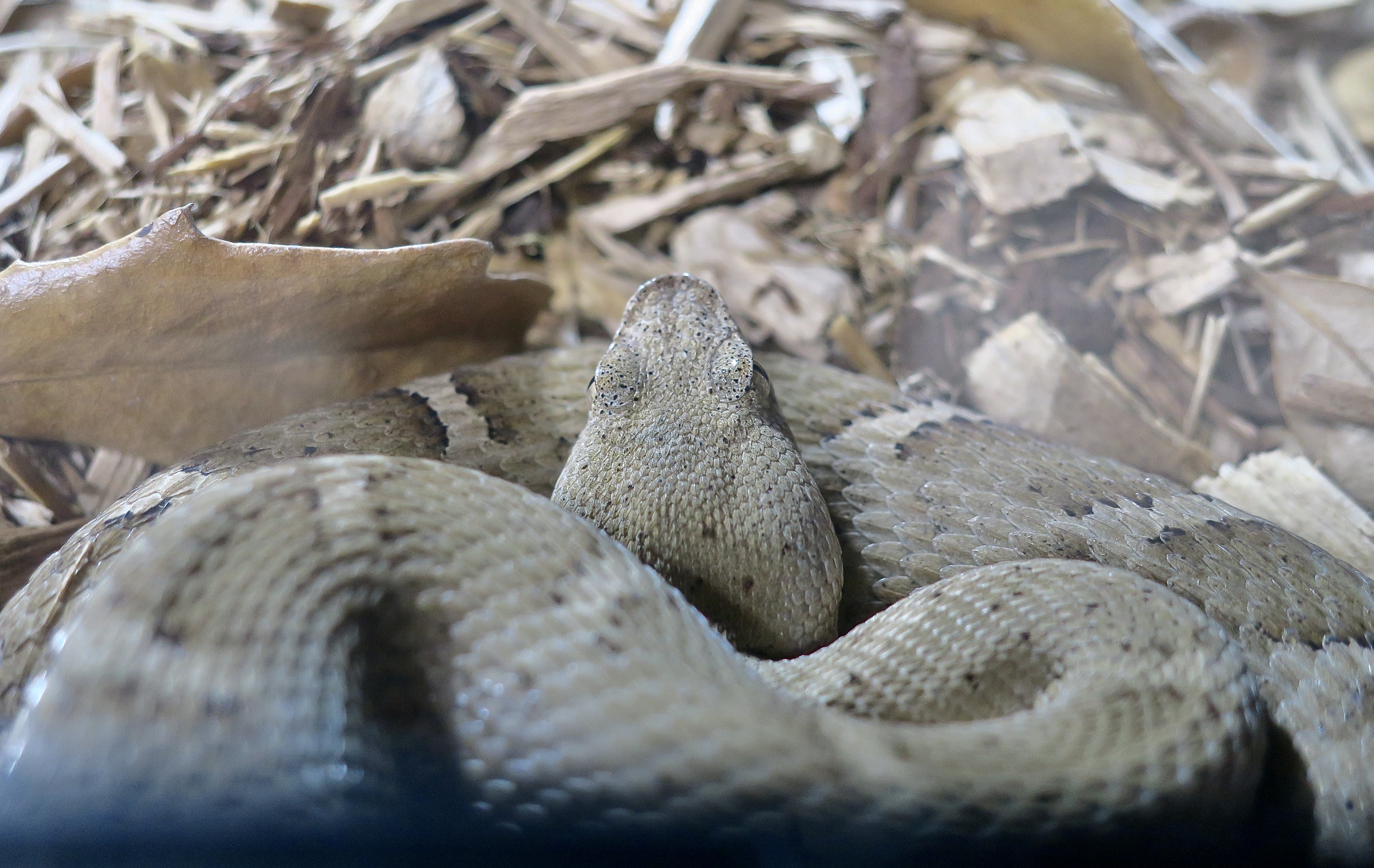
A Western Chihuahuan ridge-nosed rattlesnake at Rattlesnake Ranch, Arizona.

Dorsally, the snake is brown or red with blotched and dotted with brown markings. Its rattle is dark brown and rounded, with sharp scales as a sheath for it, as is characteristic of the species.

It is also a smaller snake, measuring up to 63.6 cm (25 in).

== Diet ==
Crotalus willardi silus has been recorded to eat rodents.

== Reproduction ==
Crotalus willardi silus is known to be ovoviviparous.
