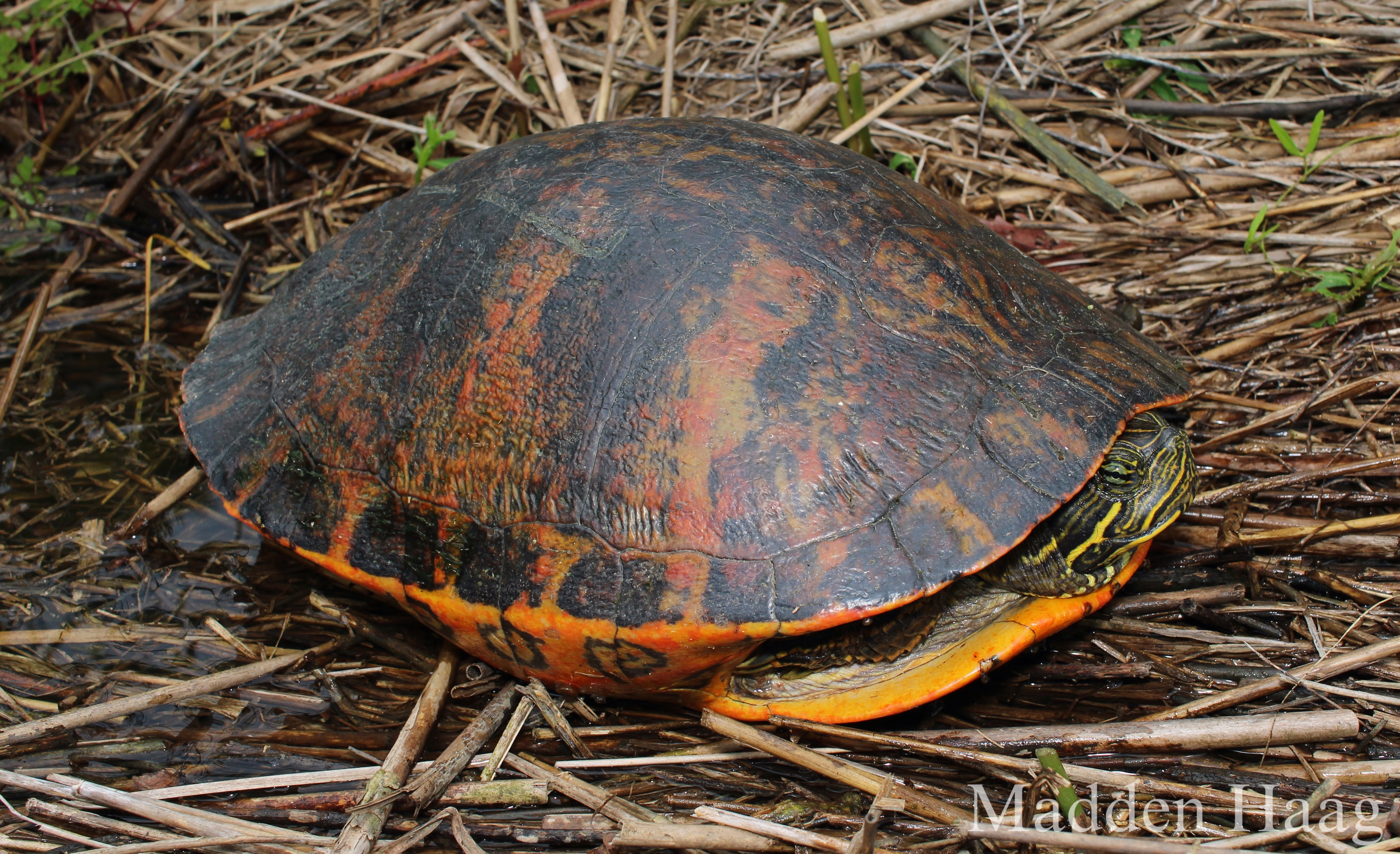
- This turtle was sitting on the bank of Mobile Bay.

Conservation status
- Endangered (IUCN 2.3)

Scientific classification
- Kingdom: Animalia
- Phylum: Chordata
- Class: Reptilia
- Order: Testudines
- Suborder: Cryptodira
- Family: Emydidae
- Genus: Pseudemys
- Species: P. alabamensis

Binomial name
- Pseudemys alabamensis (Baur, 1893)
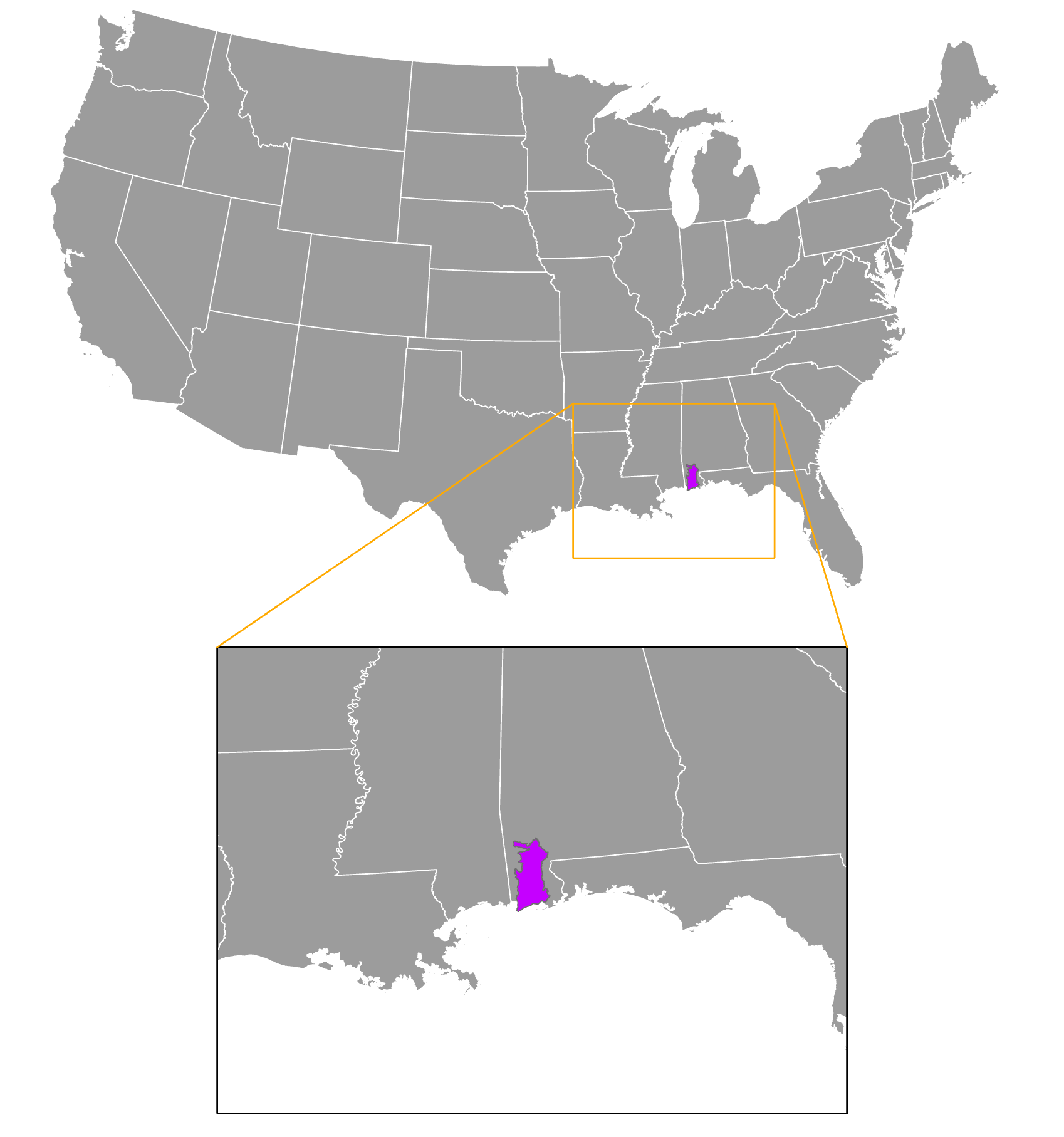
- Alabama red-bellied cooter range

Synonyms
- Pseudemys alabamensis Baur, 1893; Chrysemys ababamensis Ditmars, 1907 (ex errore); Pseudemys rubriventris alabamensis Stejneger, 1938; Chrysemys rubriventris alabamensis Obst, 1983

= Alabama red-bellied cooter =

Species of turtle native to Alabama

The Alabama red-bellied cooter (Pseudemys alabamensis) or Alabama red-bellied turtle, is native to Alabama. It belongs to the turtle family Emydidae, the pond turtles. It is the official reptile of the state of Alabama.

== Life history ==
The red-belly inhabits the fresh to brackish waters of the Mobile-Tensaw River Delta in Mobile and Baldwin counties. It feeds on aquatic vegetation and can be found sunning itself on logs. Nesting of the red-bellied turtle occurs from May through July. Female turtles lay their eggs on dry land, digging nests in sandy soil, where 4 to 9 eggs are laid. Hatchlings usually emerge during the summer. When the turtles nest in late July, hatchlings may overwinter in the nest and emerge the following spring.

A mature female can be 14 inches (360 mm), while a mature male can be 12 inches (300 mm).

== Location ==
As of June 2009 the turtle has been seen in the central part of Alabama, in the Elmore County region.

This turtle has also been found in south-eastern Mississippi, in Harrison and Jackson counties. It may also exist in northwest Florida.

== Protection ==
In 2007, a 3.4-mile (5.5 km) chain-link fence was constructed along part of the US 98 causeway (Battleship Parkway) that separates the Mobile-Tensaw delta from Mobile Bay. Hatchling deaths dropped 80% from 2007 to 2008.

=== Predation ===
Eggs and hatchlings of this turtle are eaten by humans, wild boars, raccoons, fish crows, Mexican long-nosed armadillos and red imported fire ants. Hatchlings may also be eaten by aquatic snakes and great blue herons. Adults may be eaten by American alligators.

== Gallery ==
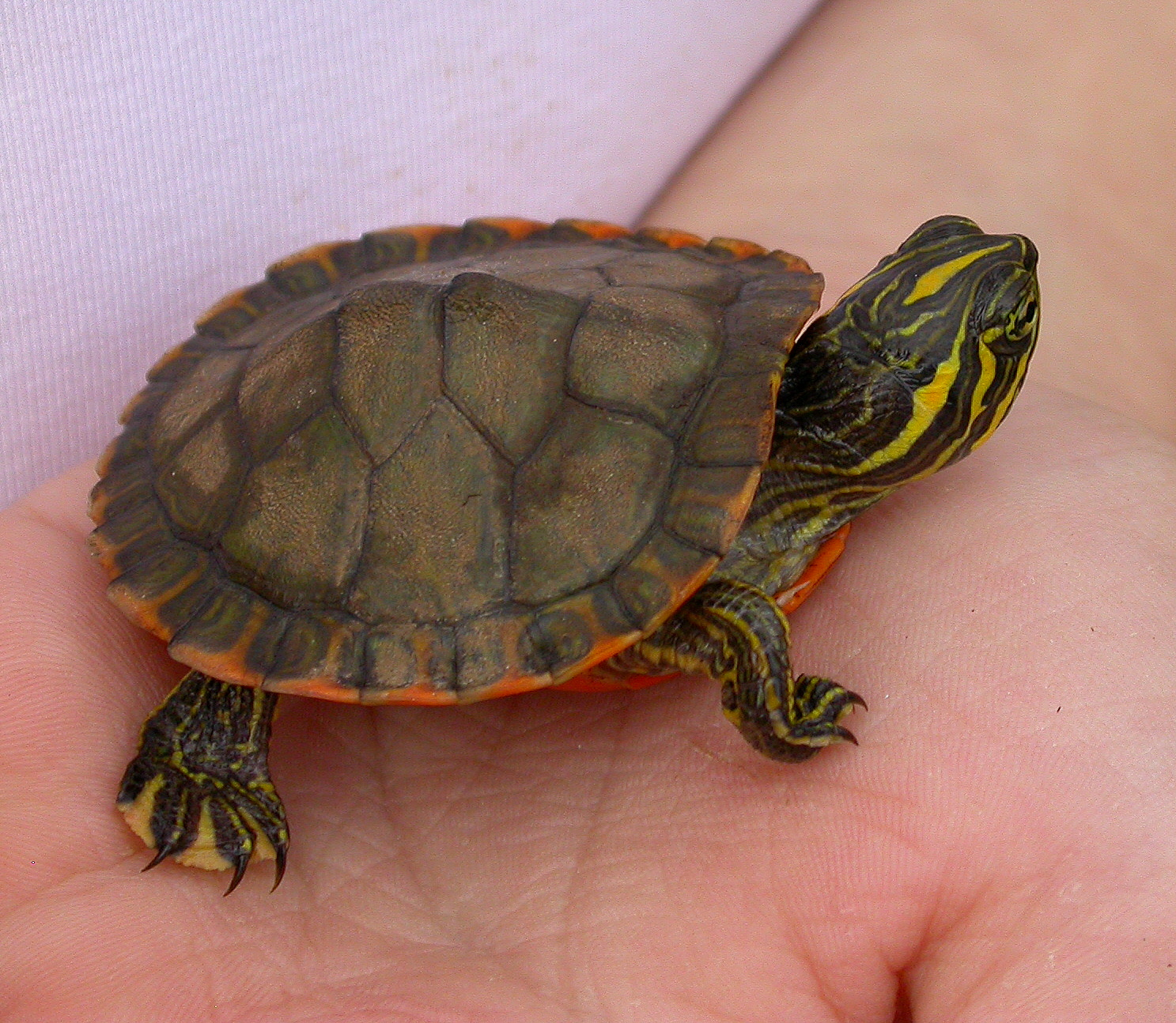
Hatchling

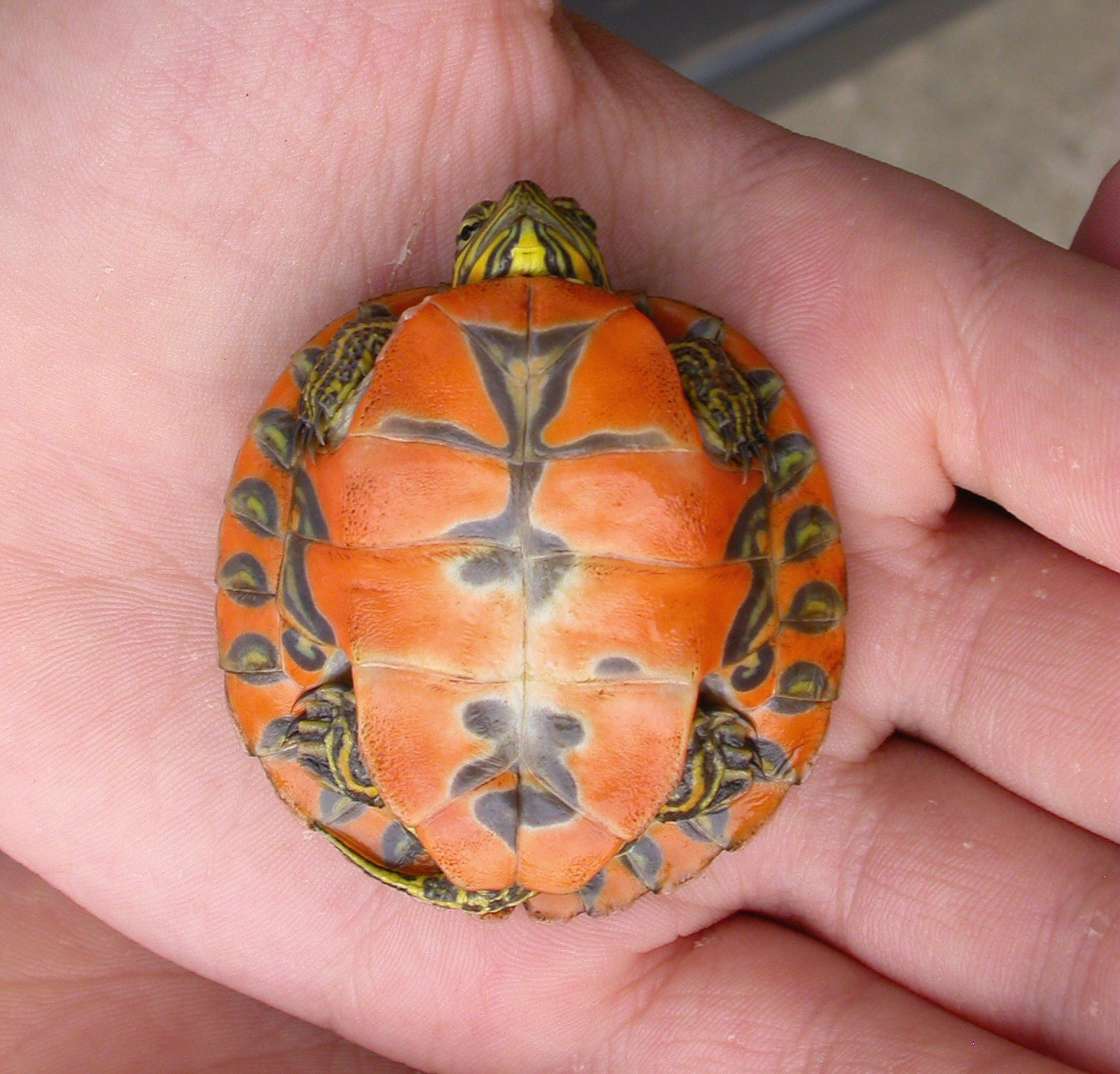
Hatchling, plastron

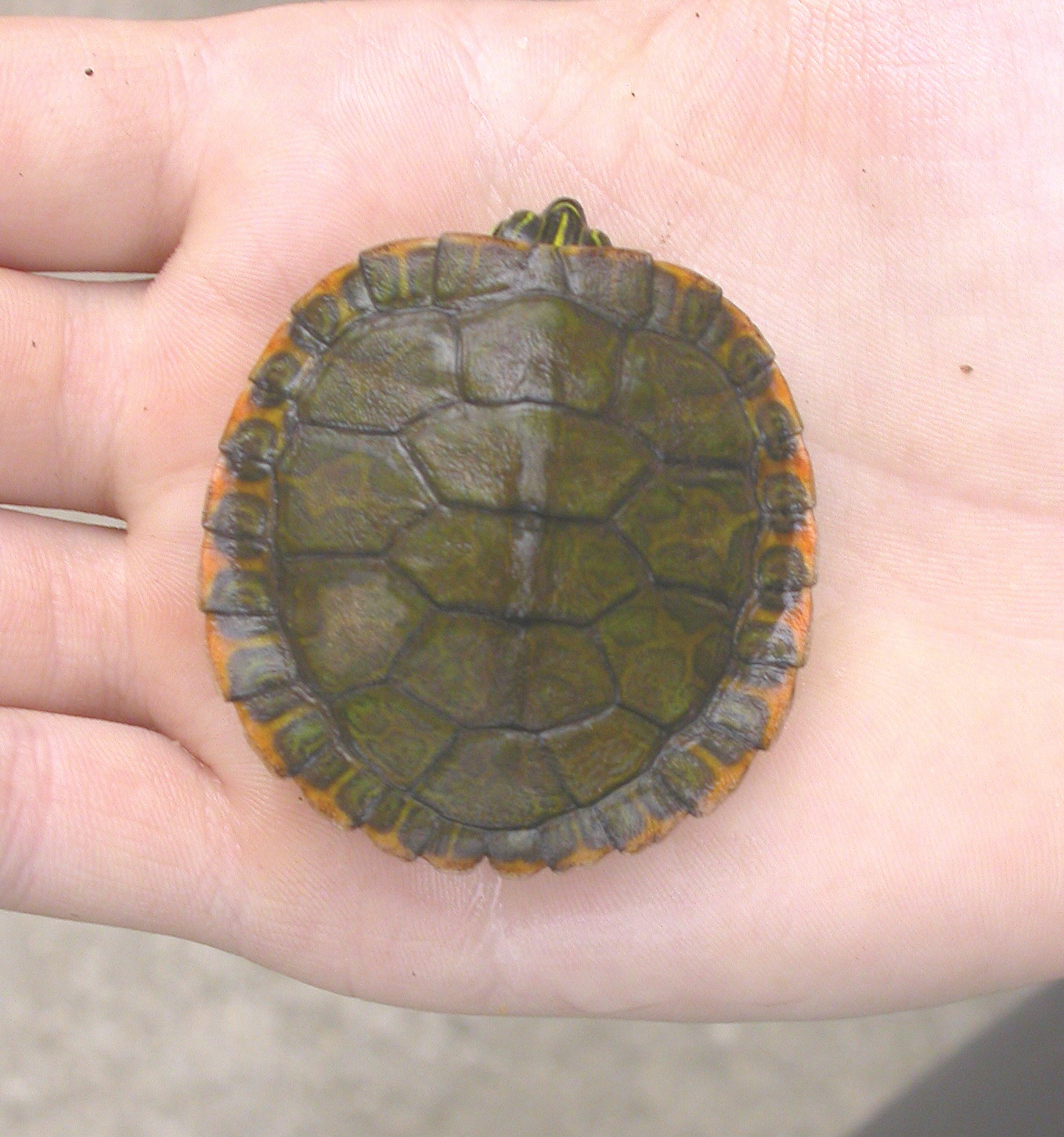
Hatchling, carapace view
