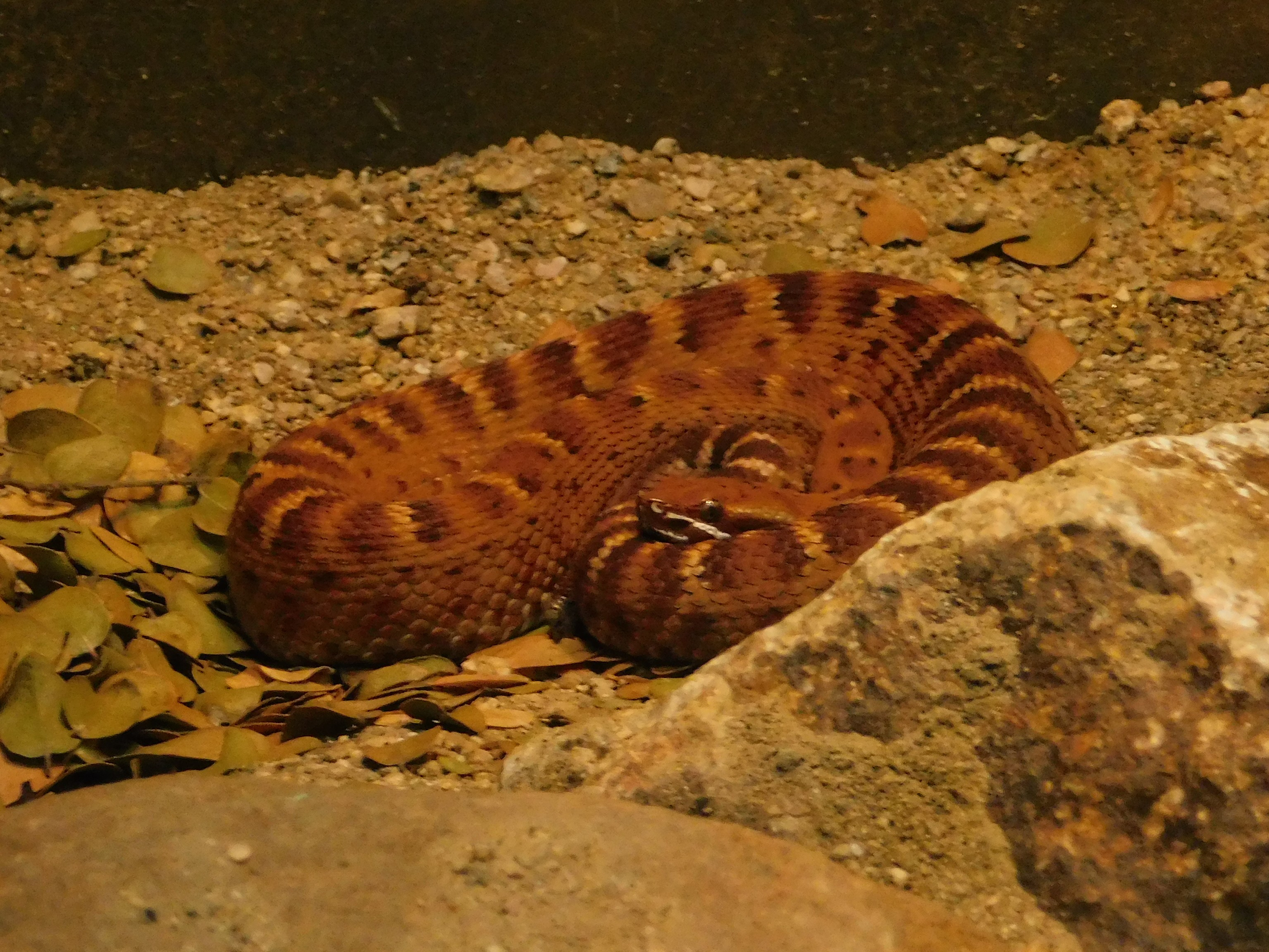

Scientific classification
- Kingdom: Animalia
- Phylum: Chordata
- Class: Reptilia
- Order: Squamata
- Suborder: Serpentes
- Family: Viperidae
- Genus: Crotalus
- Species: C. willardi
- Subspecies: C. w. amabilis

Trinomial name
- Crotalus willardi amabilis Anderson, 1962

= Crotalus willardi amabilis =

Subspecies of Mexican ridge-nosed rattlesnake

Crotalus willardi amabilis, the Del Nido ridge-nosed rattlesnake, is a subspecies of ridge-nosed rattlesnake native to Sierra del Nido, Chihuahua, Mexico. As with all rattlesnakes, it is venomous.

== Description ==
Crotalus willardi amabilis is recognised by its facial stripes, its red/pink colouration and its specific scale counts. The subspecies is distinguished from its sister subspecies by a higher number of dorsal blotches which averages 39.5.

Sexual dimorphism can be seen in its specific scale counts and tail length, with males' tails averaging 11.5% of their length, and females' tails averaging 9.3%.

== Habitat ==
The subspecies is known to inhabit isolated, high, forested areas of Sierra del Nido.

== Reproduction ==
Crotalus willardi amabilis is known to be ovoviviparous.
