= Crotalus willardi meridionalis =

Scientific classification
- Kingdom: Animalia
- Phylum: Chordata
- Class: Reptilia
- Order: Squamata
- Suborder: Serpentes
- Family: Viperidae
- Genus: Crotalus
- Species: C. willardi
- Subspecies: C. w. meridionalis

Trinomial name
- Crotalus willardi meridionalis Klauber, 1949

Subspecies of Mexican ridge-nosed rattlesnake

Crotalus willardi meridionalis, the southern ridge-nosed rattlesnake, is a subspecies of ridge-nosed rattlesnake native to Durango and Zacatecas, Mexico. As with all rattlesnakes, it is venomous.

== Description ==
Crotalus willardi meridionalis differs from its sister subspecies by lacking a stripe along its rostral and mental along with other headmarkings and by its specific scale count. Its rattle is sheathed by sharp scales, as is characteristic of the species.

== Reproduction ==
Crotalus willardi meridionalis is known to be ovoviviparous.

== Etymology ==
The name 'meridionalis' the latitude it was found in.
