= Outline of South Carolina =

Overview of and topical guide to South Carolina

The flag of South Carolina

The seal of South Carolina

The location of the state of South Carolina in the United States of America

The following outline is provided as an overview of and topical guide to South Carolina:

South Carolina – state in the Southeastern United States on the Atlantic coast. Originally part of the Province of Carolina, the Province of South Carolina was the first of the Thirteen Colonies that declared independence from the British Crown during the American Revolution. South Carolina was the first state to ratify the Articles of Confederation, the 8th state to ratify the US Constitution on May 23, 1788. South Carolina later became the first state to vote to secede from the Union which it did on December 20, 1860. It was readmitted to the United States on June 25, 1868. (Note: In Texas vs. White (1869), the Supreme Court ruled that the ordinances of secession (including that of South Carolina) were invalid, and thus those states had never left the Union. However, South Carolina did not regain representation in Congress until that date.)

== General reference ==
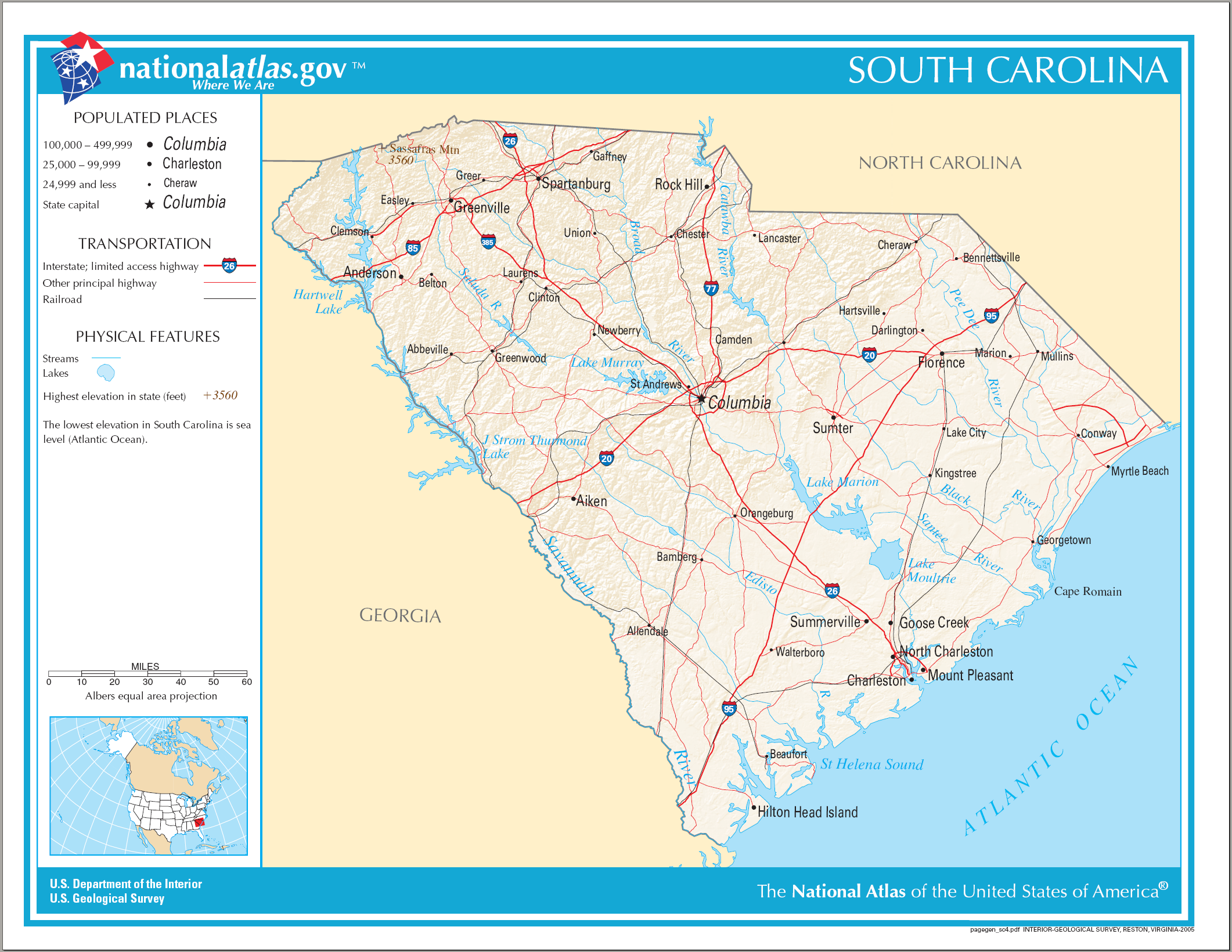
An enlargeable map of the state of South Carolina

- Names
  - Common name: South Carolina
    - Pronunciation: /ˌkærəˈlaɪnə/
  - Official name: State of South Carolina
  - Abbreviations and name codes
    - Postal symbol: SC
    - ISO 3166-2 code: US-SC
    - Internet second-level domain: .sc.us
  - Nicknames
    - Palmetto State
    - Sandlapper State
    - Iodine Products State (in disuse) (previously used on license plates)
- Adjectivals
  - South Carolina
  - South Carolinian
- Demonym: South Carolinian

== Geography of South Carolina ==
Geography of South Carolina

- South Carolina is: a U.S. state, a federal state of the United States of America
- Location
  - Northern Hemisphere
  - Western Hemisphere
    - Americas
      - North America
        - Anglo America
        - Northern America
          - United States of America
            - Contiguous United States
              - Eastern United States
                - East Coast of the United States
                - Southeastern United States
              - Southern United States
                - Deep South
- Population of South Carolina: 4,625,364 (2010 U.S. Census)
- Area of South Carolina: 32,020.5 sq mi (82,932.7 km^{2})
- Atlas of South Carolina

=== Places in South Carolina ===
- Historic places in South Carolina
  - National Historic Landmarks in South Carolina
  - National Register of Historic Places listings in South Carolina
    - Bridges on the National Register of Historic Places in South Carolina
- National Natural Landmarks in South Carolina
- National parks in South Carolina
- State parks in South Carolina

=== Environment of South Carolina ===
- Climate of South Carolina
- Protected areas in South Carolina
  - State forests of South Carolina
- Superfund sites in South Carolina
- Wildlife of South Carolina
  - Fauna of South Carolina
    - Birds of South Carolina
    - Reptiles
      - Snakes of South Carolina

==== Natural geographic features of South Carolina ====
- Rivers of South Carolina

=== Regions of South Carolina ===
==== Administrative divisions of South Carolina ====
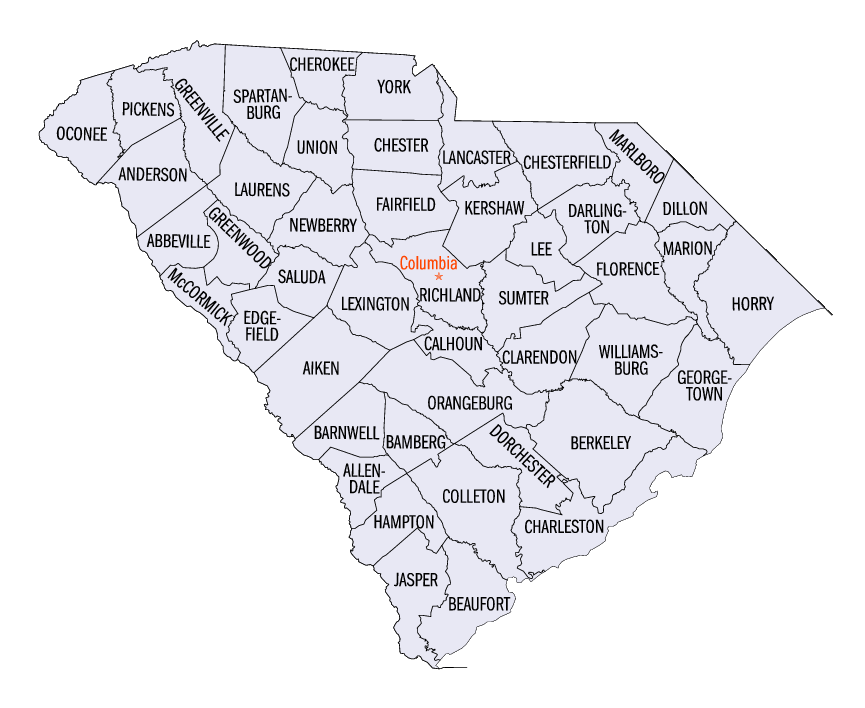
An enlargeable map of the 46 counties of the state of South Carolina

- The 46 counties of the state of South Carolina
  - Municipalities in South Carolina
    - Cities in South Carolina
      - State capital of South Carolina:
      - City nicknames in South Carolina
    - Towns in South Carolina
  - Census-designated places in South Carolina

=== Demography of South Carolina ===
Demographics of South Carolina

== Government and politics of South Carolina ==
Politics of South Carolina

- Form of government: U.S. state government
- South Carolina's congressional delegations
- South Carolina State Capitol
- Elections in South Carolina
- Political party strength in South Carolina

=== Branches of the government of South Carolina ===
Government of South Carolina

==== Executive branch of the government of South Carolina ====
- Governor of South Carolina
  - Lieutenant Governor of South Carolina
  - Secretary of State of South Carolina
- State departments
  - South Carolina Department of Transportation

==== Legislative branch of the government of South Carolina ====
- South Carolina General Assembly (bicameral)
  - Upper house: South Carolina Senate
  - Lower house: South Carolina House of Representatives

==== Judicial branch of the government of South Carolina ====
Courts of South Carolina

- Supreme Court of South Carolina

=== Law and order in South Carolina ===
Law of South Carolina

- Cannabis in South Carolina
- Capital punishment in South Carolina
  - Individuals executed in South Carolina
- Constitution of South Carolina
- Crime in South Carolina
- Gun laws in South Carolina
- Law enforcement in South Carolina
  - Law enforcement agencies in South Carolina
- Same-sex marriage in South Carolina

=== Military in South Carolina ===
- South Carolina Air National Guard
- South Carolina Army National Guard

== History of South Carolina ==
History of South Carolina

=== History of South Carolina, by period ===
- Indigenous peoples
- Spanish colony of Florida, 1565–1763
- English Province of Carolina, 1663–1707
- French colony of Louisiane, 1699–1763
- British Province of Carolina, 1707–1712
- British Province of South Carolina, 1712–1776
- French and Indian War, 1754–1763
  - Treaty of Fontainebleau of 1762
  - Treaty of Paris of 1763
- British Indian Reserve, 1763–1783
  - Royal Proclamation of 1763
- American Revolutionary War, April 19, 1775 – September 3, 1783
  - Treaty of Paris, September 3, 1783
- State of South Carolina since 1776
    - Adopts a constitution for an independent State of South Carolina, March 15, 1776
  - United States Declaration of Independence, July 4, 1776
  - Cherokee–American wars, 1776–1794
    - Second state to ratify the Articles of Confederation and Perpetual Union, signed July 9, 1778
  - Western territorial claims ceded 1787
  - Eighth State to ratify the Constitution of the United States of America on May 23, 1788
  - War of 1812, June 18, 1812 – March 23, 1815
    - Treaty of Ghent, December 24, 1814
  - Andrew Jackson becomes seventh President of the United States on March 4, 1829
  - Mexican–American War, April 25, 1846 – February 2, 1848
    - First state to declare secession from the United States on December 20, 1860
    - Founding state of the Confederate States of America on February 8, 1861
  - American Civil War, April 12, 1861 – May 13, 1865
    - South Carolina in the American Civil War
      - Battle of Fort Sumter, April 12–13, 1861
      - Carolinas campaign, January 5 – April 26, 1865
  - South Carolina in Reconstruction, 1865–1868
  - Fifth former Confederate state readmitted to the United States on July 9, 1868
- Conservative rule, 1870-1890
- Tillman era and disfranchisement, 1890-1914
- Roaring Twenties and Great Depression, 1914-1940
- South Carolina in the civil rights movement, 1950-1970
- Modern Era, 1970–present

=== History of South Carolina, by subject ===
- List of South Carolina state legislatures

== Culture of South Carolina ==
Culture of South Carolina

- Museums in South Carolina
- Religion in South Carolina
  - The Church of Jesus Christ of Latter-day Saints in South Carolina
  - Episcopal Diocese of South Carolina (disambiguation)
- Scouting in South Carolina
- State symbols of South Carolina
  - Flag of the State of South Carolina
  - Great Seal of the State of South Carolina

=== The arts in South Carolina ===
- Music of South Carolina

=== Sports in South Carolina ===
Sports in South Carolina

== Economy and infrastructure of South Carolina ==
Economy of South Carolina

- Communications in South Carolina
  - Newspapers in South Carolina
  - Radio stations in South Carolina
  - Television stations in South Carolina
- Health care in South Carolina
  - Hospitals in South Carolina
- Transportation in South Carolina
  - Airports in South Carolina

== Education in South Carolina ==
Education in South Carolina

- Schools in South Carolina
  - School districts in South Carolina
    - High schools in South Carolina
  - Colleges and universities in South Carolina
    - University of South Carolina
    - South Carolina State University
    - Clemson University

== See also ==
- Topic overview:
  - South Carolina
  - Index of South Carolina-related articles
