= Index of South Carolina–related articles =

The location of the state of South Carolina in the United States of America

The following is an alphabetical list of articles related to the U.S. state of South Carolina.

== 0–9 ==
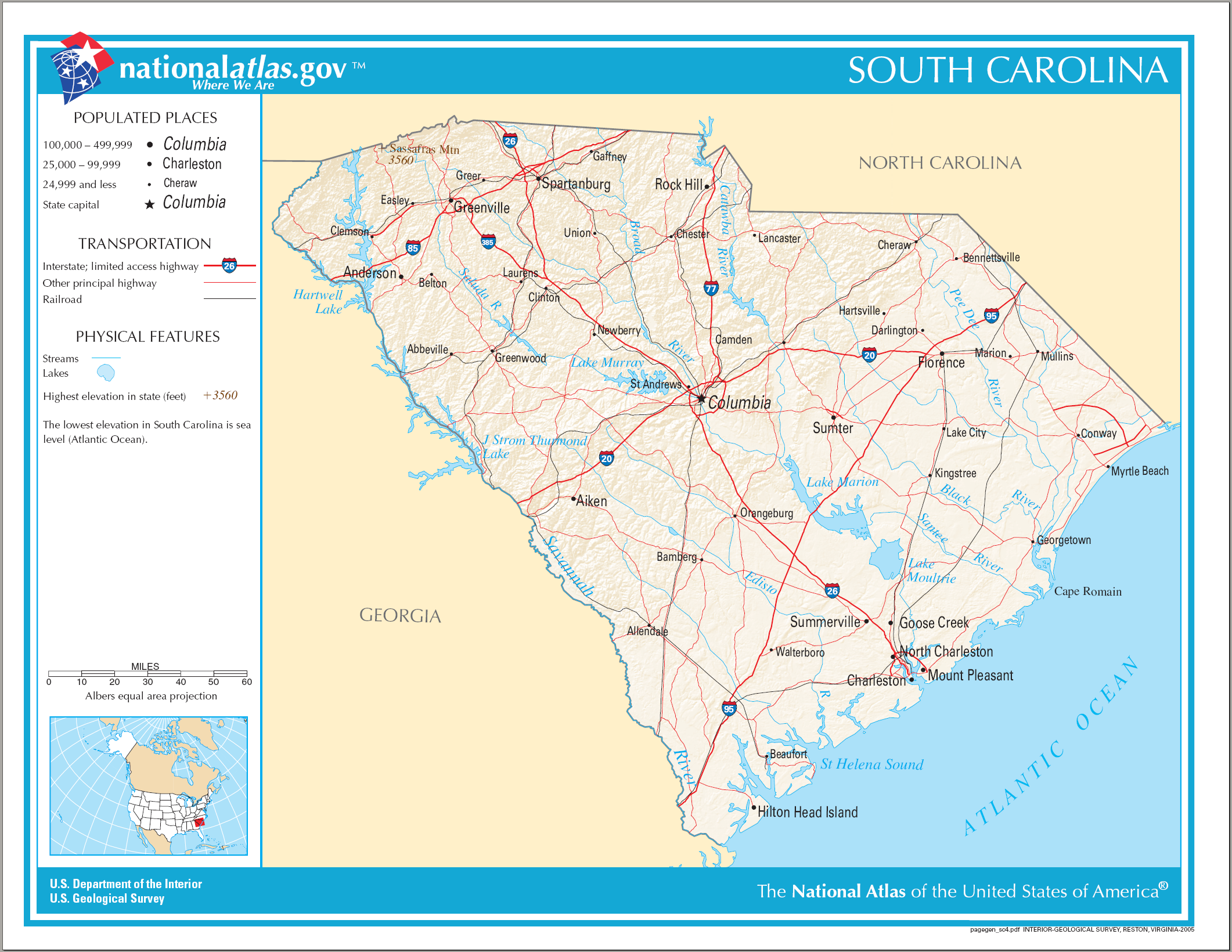
An enlargeable map of the state of South Carolina

- .sc.us – Internet second-level domain for the state of South Carolina
- 8th state to ratify the Constitution of the United States of America

== A ==
- Adjacent states:
  - State of Georgia
  - State of North Carolina
- Agriculture in South Carolina
- Airports in South Carolina
- Amusement parks in South Carolina
- Appalachia
- Aquaria in South Carolina
  - commons:Category:Aquaria in South Carolina
- Arboreta in South Carolina
  - commons:Category:Arboreta in South Carolina
- Archaeology in South Carolina
  - Category:Archaeological sites in South Carolina
    - commons:Category:Archaeological sites in South Carolina
- Architecture in South Carolina
- Art museums and galleries in South Carolina
  - commons:Category:Art museums and galleries in South Carolina
- Astronomical observatories in South Carolina
  - commons:Category:Astronomical observatories in South Carolina

== B ==
- Beaches in South Carolina
- Botanical gardens in South Carolina
  - commons:Category:Botanical gardens in South Carolina
- Buildings and structures in South Carolina
  - commons:Category:Buildings and structures in South Carolina

== C ==
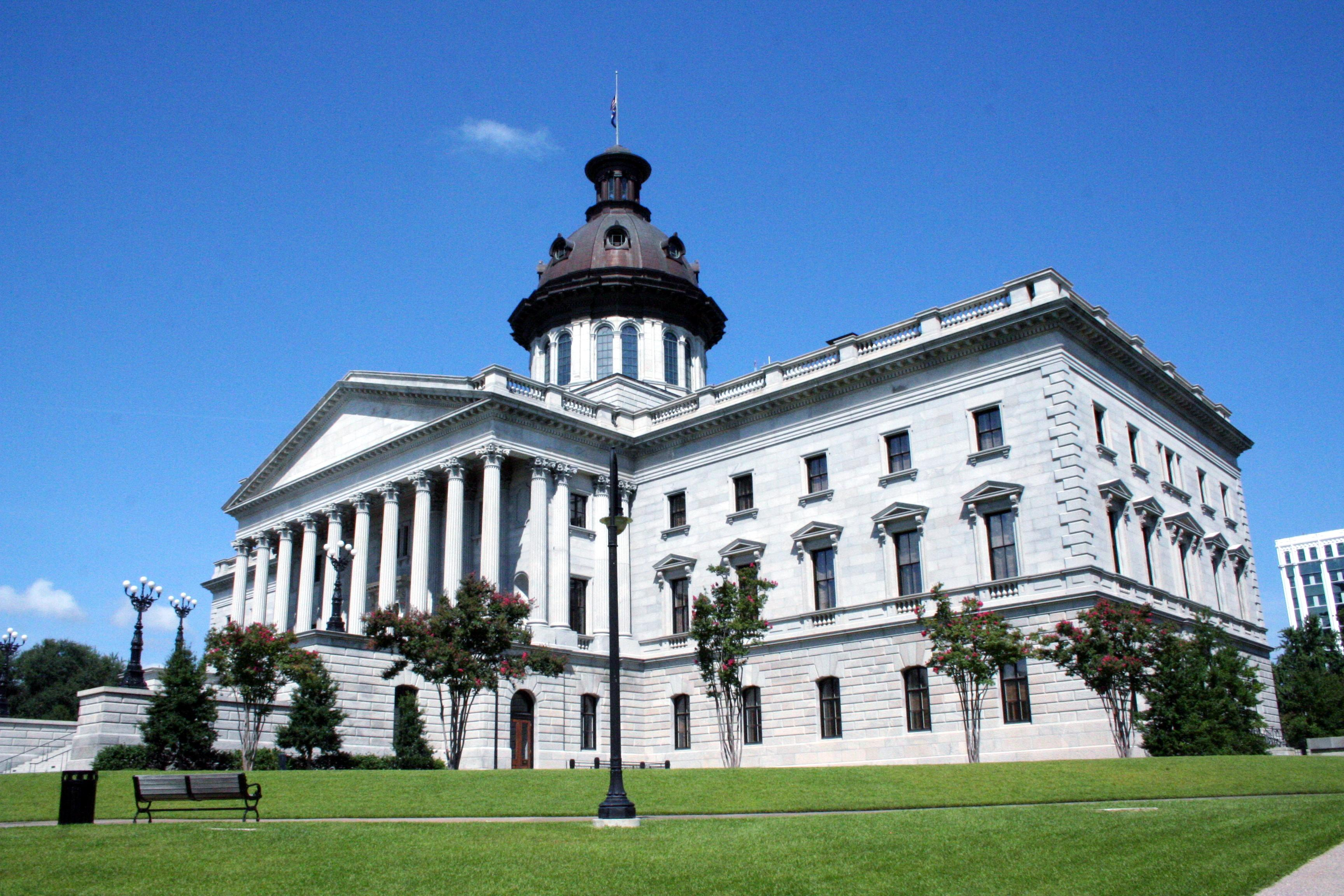
The South Carolina State House in Columbia

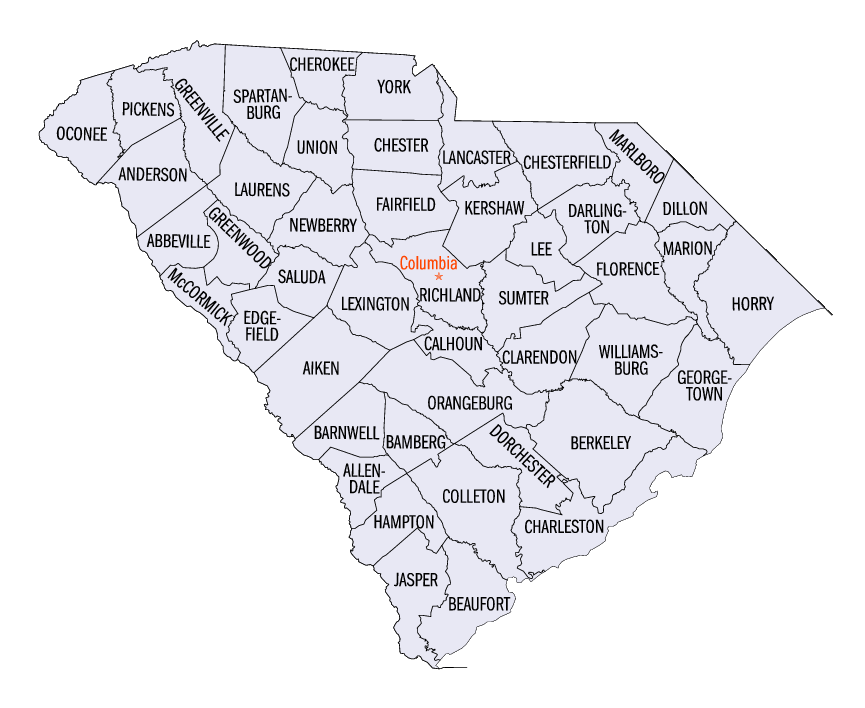
An enlargeable map of the 46 counties of the state of South Carolina

- Capital of the State of South Carolina
- Capitol of the State of South Carolina
  - commons:Category:South Carolina State Capitol
- Census statistical areas of South Carolina
- Charlestown, capital of the Province of Carolina 1670–1712, the Province of South Carolina 1712–1776, and the State of South Carolina 1776-1786
- Cities in South Carolina
  - commons:Category:Cities in South Carolina
- Climate of South Carolina
  - Category:Climate of South Carolina
    - commons:Category:Climate of South Carolina
- Colleges and universities in South Carolina
  - commons:Category:Universities and colleges in South Carolina
- Columbia, South Carolina, state capital since 1786
- Communications in South Carolina
  - Companies in South Carolina
- Congressional districts of South Carolina
- Constitution of the State of South Carolina
- Convention centers in South Carolina
  - commons:Category:Convention centers in South Carolina
- Counties of the state of South Carolina
  - commons:Category:Counties in South Carolina
- Culture of South Carolina
  - commons:Category:South Carolina culture

== D ==
- Demographics of South Carolina

== E ==
- Economy of South Carolina
  - Category:Economy of South Carolina
    - commons:Category:Economy of South Carolina
- Education in South Carolina
  - Category:Education in South Carolina
    - commons:Category:Education in South Carolina
- Elections in South Carolina
  - Category:Elections in South Carolina
    - commons:Category:Elections in South Carolina
- Category:Environment of South Carolina
  - commons:Category:Environment of South Carolina

== F ==
The Flag of the State of South Carolina

- Festivals in South Carolina
  - commons:Category:Festivals in South Carolina
- Flag of the State of South Carolina
- Forts in South Carolina
  - Category:Forts in South Carolina
    - commons:Category:Forts in South Carolina

== G ==
The Great Seal of the State of South Carolina

- Geography of South Carolina
  - Category:Geography of South Carolina
    - commons:Category:Geography of South Carolina
- Geology of South Carolina
  - commons:Category:Geology of South Carolina
- Ghost towns in South Carolina
  - Category:Ghost towns in South Carolina
    - commons:Category:Ghost towns in South Carolina
- Golf clubs and courses in South Carolina
- Government of the State of South Carolina website
  - Category:Government of South Carolina
    - commons:Category:Government of South Carolina
- Governor of the State of South Carolina
  - List of governors of South Carolina
- Great Seal of the State of South Carolina

== H ==
- High schools of South Carolina
- Higher education in South Carolina
- Highway routes in South Carolina
- Hiking trails in South Carolina
  - commons:Category:Hiking trails in South Carolina
- History of South Carolina
  - Indigenous peoples
  - Spanish colony of la Florida, 1565–1763
  - English Province of Carolina, 1663–1707
    - History of slavery in South Carolina
  - French colony of la Louisiane, 1699–1763
  - British Province of Carolina, 1707–1712
  - British Province of South Carolina, 1712–1776
  - French and Indian War, 1754–1763
    - Treaty of Fontainebleau of 1762
    - Treaty of Paris of 1763
  - British Indian Reserve, 1763–1783
    - Royal Proclamation of 1763
  - American Revolutionary War, 1775–1783
    - United States Declaration of Independence of 1776
    - Treaty of Paris of 1783
  - State of South Carolina, since 1776
    - Cherokee–American wars, 1776–1794
    - Western territorial claims ceded 1787
    - War of 1812, 1812–1815
    - South Carolina in the American Civil War, 1860–1865
      - Confederate States of America, 1861–1865
      - Battle of Fort Sumter, 1861
    - South Carolina in Reconstruction, 1865–1868
  - Category:History of South Carolina
    - commons:Category:History of South Carolina
- Hospitals in South Carolina
- House of Representatives of the State of South Carolina

== I ==
- Images of South Carolina
  - commons:Category:South Carolina
- Islands of South Carolina

== L ==
- Lakes of South Carolina
  - commons:Category:Lakes of South Carolina
- Landmarks in South Carolina
  - commons:Category:Landmarks in South Carolina
- Lieutenant Governor of the State of South Carolina
- Lists related to the State of South Carolina:
  - List of African American Historic Places in South Carolina
  - List of airports in South Carolina
  - List of beaches in South Carolina
  - List of census statistical areas in South Carolina
  - List of cities in South Carolina
  - List of colleges and universities in South Carolina
  - List of counties in South Carolina
  - List of forts in South Carolina
  - List of ghost towns in South Carolina
  - List of governors of South Carolina
  - List of high schools in South Carolina
  - List of highway routes in South Carolina
  - List of hospitals in South Carolina
  - List of islands of South Carolina
  - List of lieutenant governors of South Carolina
  - List of metropolitan areas of South Carolina
  - List of museums in South Carolina
  - List of National Historic Landmarks in South Carolina
  - List of newspapers in South Carolina
  - List of people from South Carolina
  - List of radio stations in South Carolina
  - List of railroads in South Carolina
  - List of Registered Historic Places in South Carolina
  - List of rivers of South Carolina
  - List of school districts in South Carolina
  - List of state forests in South Carolina
  - List of state parks in South Carolina
  - List of state prisons in South Carolina
  - List of symbols of the State of South Carolina
  - List of South Carolina weather records
  - List of television stations in South Carolina
  - List of towns in South Carolina
  - List of South Carolina's congressional delegations
  - List of United States congressional districts in South Carolina
  - List of United States representatives from South Carolina
  - List of United States senators from South Carolina
- List of villages in South Carolina

== M ==
- Maps of South Carolina
  - commons:Category:Maps of South Carolina
- Mass media in South Carolina
- Mountains of South Carolina
  - commons:Category:Mountains of South Carolina
- Museums in South Carolina
  - Category:Museums in South Carolina
    - commons:Category:Museums in South Carolina
- Music of South Carolina
  - commons:Category:Music of South Carolina
  - Category:Musical groups from South Carolina
  - Category:Musicians from South Carolina

== N ==
- National forests of South Carolina
  - commons:Category:National Forests of South Carolina
- Natural history of South Carolina
  - commons:Category:Natural history of South Carolina
- Newspapers of South Carolina

== O ==
- Outdoor sculptures in South Carolina
  - commons:Category:Outdoor sculptures in South Carolina

== P ==
- People from South Carolina
  - Category:People from South Carolina
    - commons:Category:People from South Carolina
    - Category:People from South Carolina by populated place
    - Category:People from South Carolina by county
    - Category:People from South Carolina by occupation
- Politics of South Carolina
  - Category:Politics of South Carolina
    - commons:Category:Politics of South Carolina
- Protected areas of South Carolina
  - commons:Category:Protected areas of South Carolina

== R ==
- Radio stations in South Carolina
- Railroads in South Carolina
- Registered historic places in South Carolina
  - commons:Category:Registered Historic Places in South Carolina
- Religion in South Carolina
  - Category:Religion in South Carolina
    - commons:Category:Religion in South Carolina
- Rivers of South Carolina
  - commons:Category:Rivers of South Carolina
- Roller coasters in South Carolina
  - commons:Category:Roller coasters in South Carolina

== S ==
- SC – United States Postal Service postal code for the State of South Carolina
- School districts of South Carolina
- Scouting in South Carolina
- Settlements in South Carolina
  - Cities in South Carolina
  - Towns in South Carolina
  - List of Census Designated Places in South Carolina
  - Other unincorporated communities in South Carolina
  - List of ghost towns in South Carolina
- Senate of the State of South Carolina
- South Carolina website
  - Category:South Carolina
    - commons:Category:South Carolina
      - commons:Category:Maps of South Carolina
- South Carolina Highway Patrol
- South Carolina Department of Transportation
- South Carolina State House
- Sports in South Carolina
  - commons:Category:Sports in South Carolina
- Sports venues in South Carolina
  - commons:Category:Sports venues in South Carolina
- State of South Carolina website
  - Constitution of the State of South Carolina
  - Government of the State of South Carolina
    - Category:Government of South Carolina
      - commons:Category:Government of South Carolina
  - Executive branch of the government of the State of South Carolina
    - Governor of the State of South Carolina
  - Legislative branch of the government of the State of South Carolina
    - Legislature of the State of South Carolina
      - Senate of the State of South Carolina
      - House of Representatives of the State of South Carolina
  - Judicial branch of the government of the State of South Carolina
    - Supreme Court of the State of South Carolina
    - South Carolina Bar
- State parks of South Carolina
  - commons:Category:State parks of South Carolina
- State prisons of South Carolina
- Structures in South Carolina
  - commons:Category:Buildings and structures in South Carolina
- Supreme Court of the State of South Carolina
- Symbols of the State of South Carolina
  - Category:Symbols of South Carolina
    - commons:Category:Symbols of South Carolina

== T ==
- Telecommunications in South Carolina
  - commons:Category:Communications in South Carolina
- Telephone area codes in South Carolina
- Television shows set in South Carolina
- Television stations in South Carolina
- Tourism in South Carolina website
  - commons:Category:Tourism in South Carolina
- Towns in South Carolina
  - commons:Category:Cities in South Carolina
- Transportation in South Carolina
  - Category:Transportation in South Carolina
    - commons:Category:Transport in South Carolina

== U ==
- United States of America
  - States of the United States of America
  - United States census statistical areas of South Carolina
  - South Carolina's congressional delegations
  - United States congressional districts in South Carolina
  - United States Court of Appeals for the Fourth Circuit
  - United States District Court for the District of South Carolina
  - United States representatives from South Carolina
  - United States senators from South Carolina
- Universities and colleges in South Carolina
  - commons:Category:Universities and colleges in South Carolina
- US-SC – ISO 3166-2:US region code for the State of South Carolina

== V ==
- Vehicle registration plates of South Carolina
- Villages in South Carolina

== W ==
- Waterfalls of South Carolina
  - commons:Category:Waterfalls of South Carolina
  Wikimedia
  - Wikimedia Commons:Category:South Carolina
    - commons:Category:Maps of South Carolina
  - Wikinews:Category:South Carolina
    - Wikinews:Portal:South Carolina
  - Wikipedia Category:South Carolina
    - Wikipedia Portal:South Carolina
    - Wikipedia:WikiProject South Carolina
      - Category:WikiProject South Carolina articles
      - Category:WikiProject South Carolina participants

== Z ==
- Zoos in South Carolina
  - commons:Category:Zoos in South Carolina

== See also ==
- Topic overview:
  - South Carolina
  - Outline of South Carolina
