= Vehicle registration plates of South Carolina =

South Carolina vehicle license plates

South Carolina
Current series
- Slogan: Where the Revolutionary War Was Won
- Size: 12 in × 6 in 30 cm × 15 cm
- Material: Aluminum
- Serial format: 123ABC
- Introduced: January 2026

Availability
- Issued by: South Carolina Department of Motor Vehicles

History
- First issued: July 1, 1917

The U.S. state of South Carolina first required its residents to register their motor vehicles and display license plates in 1917. As of 2026, plates are issued by the South Carolina Department of Motor Vehicles. Only rear plates have been required since 1975.

== Passenger baseplates ==
=== 1917 to 1975 ===
In 1956, the United States, Canada, and Mexico came to an agreement with the American Association of Motor Vehicle Administrators, the Automobile Manufacturers Association and the National Safety Council that standardized the size for license plates for vehicles (except those for motorcycles) at 6 inches (15 cm) in height by 12 inches (30 cm) in width, with standardized mounting holes. The 1955 (dated 1956) issue was the first South Carolina license plate that complied with these standards.

Image	Dates issued	Design	Slogan	Serial format	Serials issued	Notes
	1917	Embossed black serial on light yellow plate; "SC 17" at right	none	12345	5001 to approximately 41000	
	1918	Embossed white serial on green plate with border line; "SC 18" at left	none	12345	5001 to approximately 61000	
	1919	Embossed blue serial on white plate with border line; "S.C. 1919" centered at bottom	none	12-345	5-001 to approximately 73-000	
	1920	Embossed white serial on black plate with border line; "S.C. 1920" centered at bottom	none	12-345	5-001 to approximately 98-000	
	1921	Embossed red serial on black plate with border line; "S.C. 1921" centered at bottom	none	A12-345	Letter corresponds to weight class	
	1922	Embossed black serial on white plate with border line; "SC 22" at right	none	A12-345	Letter corresponds to weight class	
	1923	Embossed white serial on black plate with border line; "SC 23" at right	none	A12-345	Letter corresponds to weight class	
	1924	Embossed black serial on orange plate with border line; "24" and "SC" monogram at right	none	A123-456	Letter corresponds to weight class	
	1925	Embossed white serial on green plate with border line; "SC" monogram and "25" at right	none	A123-456	Letter corresponds to weight class	
	1926	Embossed red serial on white plate with border line; "SC" at right, with letters separated by embossed Sabal palmetto containing debossed "26"	none	A123-456	Letter corresponds to weight class	
	1927	Embossed green serial on white plate with border line; "SC" at right, with letters separated by embossed Sabal palmetto containing debossed "27"	none	A123-456	Letter corresponds to weight class	
	1928	Embossed black serial on yellow plate with border line; "SOUTH CAROLINA 1928" at bottom	none	A123-456	Letter corresponds to weight class	First use of the full state name.
	1929	Embossed black serial on white plate with border line; "SOUTH CAROLINA 1929" at bottom	none	A-12-345	Letter corresponds to weight class	
	1930	Embossed white serial on black plate with border line; "SOUTH CAROLINA 1930" at bottom	Vertical "IODINE" at right	A-12-345	Letter corresponds to weight class	The slogan referred to the high amounts of iodine found in South Carolina's produce. Similar slogans were used through 1933.
	1931	Embossed green serial on gray plate with border line; "S.C.", slogan and "31" at bottom	"THE IODINE STATE" between state abbreviation and year	A-12-345	Letter corresponds to weight class	
	1932	Embossed black serial on golden yellow plate with border line; "S.C.", slogan and "32" at top	"THE IODINE STATE" between state abbreviation and year	A-12-345	Letter corresponds to weight class	
	January – October 1933	Embossed black serial on white plate with border line; "SC 33" at right	"THE IODINE PRODUCTS STATE" at bottom	A-12-345	Letter corresponds to weight class	
	November 1933 – April; 1934	Embossed black serial on yellow plate; "SC · EXPIRES APR 30 · 34" at top	none	A-12-345	Letter corresponds to weight class	
	May – October 1934	Embossed yellow serial on black plate; "SC · EXPIRES OCT 31 · 34" at bottom	none	A-12-345	Letter corresponds to weight class	
	November 1934 – April; 1935	Embossed white serial on black plate; "SC · APRIL 30 · 35" at top	none	A-12-345	Letter corresponds to weight class	
	May – October 1935	Embossed black serial on white plate; "SC · OCTOBER 31 · 35" at bottom	none	A-12-345	Letter corresponds to weight class	
	November 1935 – April; 1936	Embossed yellow serial on black plate with border line; "SC · APRIL 30 · 36" at top	none	A-12-345	Letter corresponds to weight class	
	May – October 1936	Embossed black serial on yellow plate with border line; "SC · OCTOBER 31 · 36" at bottom	none	A-12-345	Letter corresponds to weight class	
	November 1936 – October 1937	Embossed black serial on white plate with border line; "SC · OCTOBER 31 · 37" at bottom	none	A·12·345	Letter corresponds to weight class	
	1937–38	Embossed black serial on golden yellow plate; "SOUTH CAROLINA 38" at bottom	none	A·12·345	Letter corresponds to weight class	
	1938–39	Embossed black serial on white plate; "SOUTH CAROLINA 39" at bottom	none	A·12·345	Letter corresponds to weight class	
	1939–40	Embossed golden yellow serial on black plate; "SC · OCTOBER 31 · 40" at bottom	none	A·12·345	Letter corresponds to weight class	
	1940–41	Embossed black serial on golden yellow plate; "SOUTH CAROLINA 41" at bottom	none	A·12·345	Letter corresponds to weight class	
	1941–42	Embossed golden yellow serial on black plate; "SOUTH CAROLINA 42" at top	none	A·12·345	Letter corresponds to weight class	
	1942–44	Embossed black serial on golden yellow plate; "SOUTH CAROLINA 43" at bottom	none	A·12·345	Letter corresponds to weight class	Revalidated for 1944 with green tabs, due to metal conservation for World War II.
	1945	Embossed yellow serial on green plate; "SOUTH CAROLINA 45" at top	none	A·12·345	Letter corresponds to weight class	
	1946	Embossed silver serial on black plate; "SOUTH CAROLINA 46" at bottom	none	A·123·456	Letter corresponds to weight class	
	1947	Embossed black serial on golden yellow plate; "SOUTH CAROLINA 47" at top	none	A·123·456	Letter corresponds to weight class	
	1948	Embossed yellow serial on black plate; "SOUTH CAROLINA 48" at bottom	none	A·123·456	Letter corresponds to weight class	
	1949	Embossed white serial on black plate; "SOUTH CAROLINA 49" at top	none	A·123·456	Letter corresponds to weight class	
	1950	Embossed black serial on white plate; "SOUTH CAROLINA 50" at bottom	none	A·123·456	Letter corresponds to weight class	
	1951	Embossed white serial on black plate; "SOUTH CAROLINA 51" at top	none	A·123·456	Letter corresponds to weight class	
	1952	Embossed yellow serial on black plate; "SOUTH CAROLINA 52" at bottom	none	A·123·456	Letter corresponds to weight class	
	1953	Embossed black serial on golden yellow plate; "SOUTH CAROLINA 53" at top	none	A·123·456	Letter corresponds to weight class	
	1954	Embossed white serial on black plate; "SOUTH CAROLINA 54" at bottom	none	A·123·456	Letter corresponds to weight class	
	1955	Embossed black serial on white plate; "SOUTH CAROLINA 55" at top	none	A·123·456	Letter corresponds to weight class	
	1956	Embossed black serial on yellow plate; "SOUTH CAROLINA 56" at bottom	none	A-123456	Letter corresponds to weight class	
	1957	Embossed white serial on blue plate; "SOUTH CAROLINA 57" at top	none	A-123456	Letter corresponds to weight class	
	1958	Embossed blue serial on white plate; "SOUTH CAROLINA 58" at bottom	none	A-123456	Letter corresponds to weight class	
	1959	Embossed white serial on blue plate; "SOUTH CAROLINA 59" at top	none	A-123456	Letter corresponds to weight class	
	1960	Embossed blue serial on white plate; "SOUTH CAROLINA 60" at bottom	none	A-123456	Letter corresponds to weight class	
	1961	Embossed red serial on white plate with border line; "SOUTH CAROLINA 61" at top	none	A-123456	Letter corresponds to weight class	
	1962	Embossed white serial on red plate with border line; "SOUTH CAROLINA 62" at bottom	none	A-123456	Letter corresponds to weight class	
	1963	Embossed white serial on green plate with border line; "SOUTH CAROLINA 63" at top	none	A-123456	Letter corresponds to weight class	
	1964	Embossed white serial on black plate with border line; "SOUTH CAROLINA 64" at bottom	none	A-123456; AB-1234	First letter corresponds to weight class	Two-letter serial format introduced for each weight class, though the one-letter format continued to be used.
	1965	Embossed black serial on white plate with border line; "SOUTH CAROLINA 65" at top	none	A-123456; AB-1234	First letter corresponds to weight class	
	1966	Embossed white serial on blue plate with border line; "SOUTH CAROLINA 66" at bottom	none	A 123456; AB 1234	First letter corresponds to weight class	
	1967	Embossed dark blue serial on white plate with border line; "SOUTH CAROLINA" and "1967" centered at top and bottom respectively	none	A 123456; AB 1234	First letter corresponds to weight class	
	1968	Embossed white serial on black plate with border line; "SOUTH CAROLINA" and "AUTO" centered at top and bottom respectively; "19" at bottom left and "68" at bottom right	none	A 123456	Letter corresponds to weight class	
	1969	Embossed white serial on blue plate with border line; "SOUTH CAROLINA" and "1969" centered at top and bottom respectively	none	A 123456; AB 1234	First letter corresponds to weight class	
	1970	Embossed white serial on green plate with border line; "SOUTH CAROLINA" at top	"300 YEARS" centered at bottom, with "1670" to the left and "1970" to the right	A 123456; AB 1234	First letter corresponds to weight class	Commemorated the 300th anniversary of the settlement of South Carolina.
	1971	Embossed white serial on brown plate with border line; "SOUTH CAROLINA" at top and "1971" centered at bottom	none	A 123456; AB 1234	First letter corresponds to weight class	
	1972	Embossed white serial on black plate with border line; "SOUTH CAROLINA" at top and "1972" centered at bottom	none	ABC 123	AAA 101 to approximately TOW 250	For each three-letter series, only the numbers 101–250 were issued. This practice continued through 1975.
	1973	Embossed white serial on blue plate with border line; "SOUTH CAROLINA" at top and "1973" centered at bottom	none	ABC 123	AAA 101 to approximately VEP 250	
	1974	Embossed white serial on green plate with border line; "SOUTH CAROLINA" at top and "1974" centered at bottom	none	ABC 123	AAA 101 to approximately WJC 250	
	1975	Embossed white serial on maroon plate with border line; "SOUTH CAROLINA" at top and "1975" centered at bottom	none	ABC 123	AAA 101 to approximately WRC 250	

=== 1976 to present ===
Image	Dates issued	Design	Slogan	Serial format	Serials issued	Notes
	1976 – December 1979	Embossed blue serial on reflective white plate; red Sabal palmetto and blue cannon screened in the center; "1775" and "1783" screened in blue on either side of cannon; red band screened at bottom containing "SOUTH CAROLINA" in white in the center	"1776 Bicentennial 1976" screened in blue at top	ABC 123	AAA 101 to WZZ 400; AAA 401 to WZZ 500	Commemorated both the US Bicentennial and the Revolutionary War. Numbers 101–400 issued for each three-letter series first, followed by 401–500 from 1978.
	January 1980 – December 1984	Embossed blue serial on reflective white plate; white state seal on pale blue state shape screened in the center; "South Carolina" screened in blue centered at bottom	none	ABC 123	AAA 101 to YZZ 500	Numbers 101–500 issued for each three-letter series.
	January 1985 – December 1989	Embossed blue serial on reflective white plate; pale blue Sabal palmetto screened in the center; "SOUTH CAROLINA" screened in red at top	none	ABC 123	AAA 501 to ZZZ 999	Numbers 501–900 issued for each three-letter series, with 901–999 added in 1988.
	January 1990 – December 1997	Embossed black serial on reflective white plate; Carolina wren on yellow jessamine vine screened at top; "SOUTH CAROLINA" screened in brown centered at bottom	none	ABC 123	AAA 101 to YZZ 500; AAA 501 to YZZ 900	Awarded "Plate of the Year" for best new license plate of 1990 by the Automobile License Plate Collectors Association, the first and, to date, only time South Carolina has been so honored. Numbers 101–500 issued for each three-letter series first, followed by 501–900 from mid-1991.
	January 1998 – October 2007	Embossed black serial on reflective white plate; light blue mountain graphic screened at top and sides and Sabal palmetto in the center; "South Carolina" screened in light blue centered at bottom	"Smiling Faces. Beautiful Places." screened in black at top	123 ABC	101 AAA to approximately 900 XBJ	Numbers 101–900 issued for each three-letter series, with 901–999 added in late 2007 at the XCR series. Letters I, O and Q not used, and U used only from 2002 onwards, beginning with the NKU series.
	October 2007 – June; 2008	As above, but with serial screened rather than embossed	"Smiling Faces. Beautiful Places." screened in black at top	123 ABC	101 XBK to approximately 999 XXM	Numbers 101–900 issued for each three-letter series, with 901–999 added in late 2007 at the XCR series. Letters I, O and Q not used, and U used only from 2002 onwards, beginning with the NKU series.
	July; 2008 – January 2016	Screened black serial on multicolored sunset background with state flag motif at center	TRAVEL2SC.COM	ABC 123	AAA 101 to LZD 799	Letter O not used in serials; this practice continued until October 2023.
	February 2016 – October 2023	Screened black serial on white and blue background with state flag motif at center	While I Breathe, I Hope.	ABC 123	LZD 800 to XMV 999	
	October 2023 – December 2025	Screened black serial on white and blue background with state flag motif at center	While I Breathe, I Hope.	ABC 123	YAA 101 to YCL 750	New serial font. Letter O used. Plates from this edition also feature a very small number on the bottom center from the manufacturer.
	October 2023 – December 2025	Screened black serial on white and blue background with state flag motif at center	While I Breathe, I Hope.	123 ABC	Exclusively 101 AAA to approximately 999 CUU; intermittently from 101 CUV to 999 DDL	New serial font. Letter O used. Plates from this edition also feature a very small number on the bottom center from the manufacturer.
	January 2026 – present		Where the Revolutionary War Was Won	123ABC	Intermittently from 101CUV to 999DDL; exclusively from 101DDM to 433DEN (as of February 7, 2026)	

== Optional plates ==
Image	Dates issued	Design	Slogan	Serial format	Serials issued	Notes
	February 2003 – October 2007	Embossed black serial on light blue and white gradient plate; national and state flags on gold flagpole screened in the center; "South Carolina" screened in blue centered at bottom	"IN GOD WE TRUST" screened in gold centered at top, with gradient gold stripe below	123 4AB	100 1AA to approximately 400 0DT	No cost.
	October 2007 – December 2015	As above, but with serial screened rather than embossed	"IN GOD WE TRUST" screened in gold centered at top, with gradient gold stripe below	123 4AB	400 1DT to approximately 999 9HQ	No cost.
	January 2016 – present	Screened black serial on white plate; national and state flags on gold flagpole screened at left; "South Carolina" screened in black centered at bottom	"IN GOD WE TRUST" screened in black centered at top, with blue stripe above and red stripe below	1234AB	1001HR to 8008RR (as of September 18, 2023)	No cost.

== Non-passenger plates ==
Image	Type	Dates issued	Design	Serial format	Serials issued	Notes
	Dealer	January 2016 – present	Screened black serial on reflective white plate; "South Carolina" screened at bottom; "Dealer" screened at top with blue stripe above and red stripe below	X123456	X622001 to present	Issued annually from 2008 to 2015. X123456 serial format used during this period, with the first digit after the 'X' corresponding to the last digit of the year of expiration (9 for 2008, 0 for 2009 and so on up to 6 for 2015). Serials on the current plate continue from where those on the 2015 plate left off.
	Disabled	January 2010 – present	Screened black serial on reflective graphic plate with Sabal palmetto against a light blue and white gradient sky; "SOUTH CAROLINA" screened at bottom and International Symbol of Access at left	123456W	1001W to present	
	Motorcycle	1995–2000	Embossed blue serial on white plate with border line; "SOUTH CAROLINA" at top	Z12345	Z10001 to Z99999	Serials ZA0001 through ZA9999 and Z/A10001 through Z/A99999 reserved for antique motorcycles.
	Motorcycle	2000–07	Embossed blue serial on white plate with border line; "SOUTH CAROLINA" at top	ZB1234	ZB0001 to ZZ9999	Serials ZA0001 through ZA9999 and Z/A10001 through Z/A99999 reserved for antique motorcycles.
	Motorcycle	2007–08	As above, but with state name and letters in serial screened rather than embossed	Z/B12345	Z/B10001 to approximately Z/B40000	Serials ZA0001 through ZA9999 and Z/A10001 through Z/A99999 reserved for antique motorcycles.
	Motorcycle	2008 – April 2015	As above, but with all elements screened	Z/B12345	Z/B40001 to Z/C99999	Serials ZA0001 through ZA9999 and Z/A10001 through Z/A99999 reserved for antique motorcycles.
	Motorcycle	May 2015 – present	Screened black serial on reflective white plate; "South Carolina" screened at top with blue stripe above and red stripe below	Z/B12345	Z/D10001 to present	Serials ZA0001 through ZA9999 and Z/A10001 through Z/A99999 reserved for antique motorcycles.
	Truck	1996–2008	Embossed red serial on white plate with border line; "SOUTH CAROLINA" and "TRUCK" at top and bottom respectively	P123456	P100001 to approximately P393500	
	Truck	2008 – April 2015	As above, but with elements screened rather than embossed	P123456	P393501 to approximately P500000	
	Truck	May 2015 – present	Screened black serial on reflective white plate; "South Carolina" screened at bottom; "Property Carrying" screened at top with blue stripe above and red stripe below	P123456	P500001 to present	

== Special plates ==
Image	Type	Dates issued	Design	Text	Serial format	Serials issued	Notes
	Manufacturers' Plate		Screened black serial on white plate	Motor Vehicle Manufacturer	AB 1234	AA0001 to present	
	Government Permanent Plate		Screened black serial on white plate, with state seal at left	Permanent	SG 12345 - State Government		
	Government Permanent Plate		Screened black serial on white plate, with state seal at left	Permanent	RG 12345 - Regional Government		
	Government Permanent Plate		Screened black serial on white plate, with state seal at left	Permanent	CG 12345 - County Government		
	Government Permanent Plate		Screened black serial on white plate, with state seal at left	Permanent	MG 12345 - Municipal Government		
	Government Permanent Plate		Screened black serial on white plate, with state seal at left	Permanent	TG 12345 - Tribal Government		
