= List of North Carolina state symbols =

North Carolina's symbols

Location of the state of North Carolina in the United States of America

The state of North Carolina has 42 official state emblems, as well as other designated places and events. The majority is determined by acts of the North Carolina General Assembly and record in Chapters 144, 145, and 149 of the North Carolina General Statutes. The state's nicknames – "The Old North State" and "The Tar Heel State" – are both traditional, but have never been passed into law by the General Assembly.

The first symbol was the Seal of North Carolina, which was made official in 1871. The original seal also contained the future state motto. It served as the state's only emblem for 14 years until the adoption of the state flag in 1885. Enacted by law in 2013, the newest symbols of North Carolina are the state art medium, clay; the state fossil, the megalodon teeth; the state frog, the Pine Barrens tree frog; the state marsupial, the Virginia opossum; and the state salamander, the marbled salamander.

== Insignia ==
Type	Symbol	Year	Image	Source
Flag	"That the flag of North Carolina shall consist of a blue union, containing in the center thereof a white star with the letter N in gilt on the left and the letter C in gilt on the right of said star, the circle containing the same to be one-third the width of the union. The fly of the flag shall consist of two equally proportioned bars; the upper bar to be red, the lower bar to be white; that the length of the bars horizontally shall be equal to the perpendicular length of the union, and the total length of the flag shall be one-third more than its width. That above the star in the center of the union there shall be a gilt scroll in semi-circular form, containing in black letters this inscription 'May 20, 1775,' and that below the star there shall be a similar scroll containing in black letters the inscription: 'April 12, 1776.'"	1885	North Carolina flag	
Motto	Esse quam videri ("To be, rather than to seem")	1893		
Nicknames	Old North State; Tar Heel State	Traditional		
Seal	The Seal of North Carolina	1871 (Revised in 1983)	North Carolina state seal	

== Flora ==
Type	Symbol	Year	Image	Source
Carnivorous plant	Venus flytrap Dionaea muscipula	2005	Venus flytrap	
Christmas tree	Fraser fir Abies fraseri	2005	Fraser fir	
Flower	Flowering dogwood Cornus florida	1941	American dogwood	
Tree	Pine; Genus Pinus	1963	Pine	
Wildflower	Carolina lily Lilium michauxii	2003	Carolina lily	

== Fauna ==
Type	Symbol	Year	Image	Source
Bird	Cardinal	1943		
Butterfly	Eastern tiger swallowtail	2012	Eastern tiger swallowtail	
Dog	Plott Hound	1989	Plott Hound	
Fossil	Megalodon teeth	2013		
Freshwater trout	Southern Appalachian brook trout	2005	brook trout	
Frog	Pine Barrens tree frog Hyla andersonii	2013	Pine Barrens tree frog	
Horse	Colonial Spanish Mustang	2010		
Insect	Western honey bee (Apis mellifera)	1973	Western honey bee	
Mammal	Eastern gray squirrel Sciurus carolinensis	1969	Eastern gray squirrel	
Marsupial	Virginia opossum Didelphis virginiana	2013	Virginia opossum	
Reptile	Eastern box turtle	1979	Eastern box turtle	
Salamander	Marbled salamander Ambystoma opacum	2013	Marbled salamander	
Saltwater fish	Channel bass	1971		
Shell	Scotch bonnet	1965	Scotch bonnet	

== Geology ==
Type	Symbol	Year	Image	Source
Mineral	Gold; Aurum	2011		
Rock	Granite	1979		
Stone	Emerald	1973		

== Culture ==
Type	Symbol	Year	Image	Source
Art medium	Clay	2013		
Beverage	Milk	1987		
Birthplace of traditional pottery	Seagrove Area	2005		
Blue berry	Blueberry; Vaccinium genus	2001		
Colors	The red and blue of the North Carolina and United States flags	1945		
Cookie	Moravian cookie	2026		
Folk dance	Clogging	2005		
Fruit	Scuppernong grape Vitis genus	2001		
Historical boat	Shad boat	1987		
Language	English language	1987		
Popular dance	Shagging	2005		
Red berry	Strawberry; Fragaria genus	2001		
Song	"The Old North State"	1927		
Theatre	Flat Rock Playhouse	1961		
Star	Moravian star	2026		
Sport	Stock car racing	2011		
Toast	The Tar Heel Toast	1957		
Tartan	Carolina tartan	1991		
Vegetable	Sweet potato	1995		

== See also ==
- List of North Carolina-related topics
- Lists of United States state insignia
- State of North Carolina
