= List of South Carolina state symbols =

Location of South Carolina in the United States of America

The state of South Carolina has many official state symbols, holidays and designations and they have been selected to represent the history, resources, and possibilities of the state. The palmetto and crescent of the state flag is South Carolina's best-known symbol. It is seen on shirts and bumperstickers and is often adapted throughout the state to show support for collegiate teams or interest in particular sports activities.

== Symbols of sovereignty ==
The state has several symbols that represent its sovereignty and from where it was gained. The state House of Representatives has used a ceremonial mace since 1880. When the House is in session, the mace is placed in a specially designed rack in front of the Speaker of the House. The state Senate uses a sword of state. The current sword of state was a gift from Lord Halifax, a former British ambassador to the United States, and has been in use since 1951. The original sword of state was obtained in 1704 and used by the governor of the South Carolina Colony. The state flag originated to represent the militia that fought for independence in 1776. The Seal of South Carolina was adopted in 1776. The seals of the Senate and House incorporate the sword of state and the mace respectively.

== List of state symbols ==
State symbols (year adopted):

- State amphibian: spotted salamander (Ambystoma maculatum) – The spotted salamander is the only amphibian indigenous to the whole state and was nominated by a third grade class from Woodlands Heights Elementary School, Spartanburg, as the state amphibian. (1999)
- State animal: white-tailed deer (Odocoileus virginianus) – Every county in South Carolina features an open season on deer. (1972)
- State beverages
  - State beverage: milk – Milk was selected as the official beverage of the state because of its dietary value and since dairy farms are found in 39 of 46 counties. The dairy industry in South Carolina generates $200 million in economic activity. (1984)
  - State hospitality beverage: tea (Camellia sinensis) – The first place that tea was grown in the United States was in South Carolina in 1799. It continues to be grown at the Charleston Tea Garden on Wadmalaw Island.
- State birds
  - State bird: Carolina wren (Thryothorus ludovicianus) – The mockingbird was designated the state bird from 1939 until 1948, when the wren received the designation. The wren was chosen as the state bird because its song can be heard all year long. (1948)
  - State wild game bird: wild turkey (Meleagris gallopavo) – Hunted during a spring season, wild turkeys are found throughout the state. (1976)
  - State duck: wood duck (Aix sponsa) – The wood duck is also known as the summer duck and the Carolina duck. (2009)
- State butterfly: eastern tiger swallowtail (Papilio glaucus) – English artist Mark Catesby painted the first picture of this butterfly in South Carolina in 1725. (1994)
- State color: indigo blue – The color indigo blue comes from the uniforms of the 2nd South Carolina Regiment, led by Colonel William Moultrie. The state flag is indigo blue in remembrance of this regiment and the palmetto tree on the flag recalls their successful defense of Charleston using a fort built of palmetto logs. (2008)
- State craft: sweetgrass basket weaving – Sweetgrass (Muhlenbergia sericea), being native to the coastal dunes of the Carolinas, provided the perfect material for African slaves to utilize their traditional skills and produce a tightly woven coiled basket. This handcraft has been passed down through generations and a high concentration of basket weavers is still found near Mount Pleasant. To this day, the form of the sweetgrass baskets woven in South Carolina closely resemble their African counterparts.
- State dances
  - State dance: shag – The shag was selected as the state dance because it originated in South Carolina. (1984)
  - State American folk dance: square dance – Square dancing is recognized for its contributions to the cultural life of South Carolina. (1994)
  - State waltz: "Richardson Waltz" – The state waltz originated from the descendants of Richard Richardson, an American Revolutionary War general. (2000)

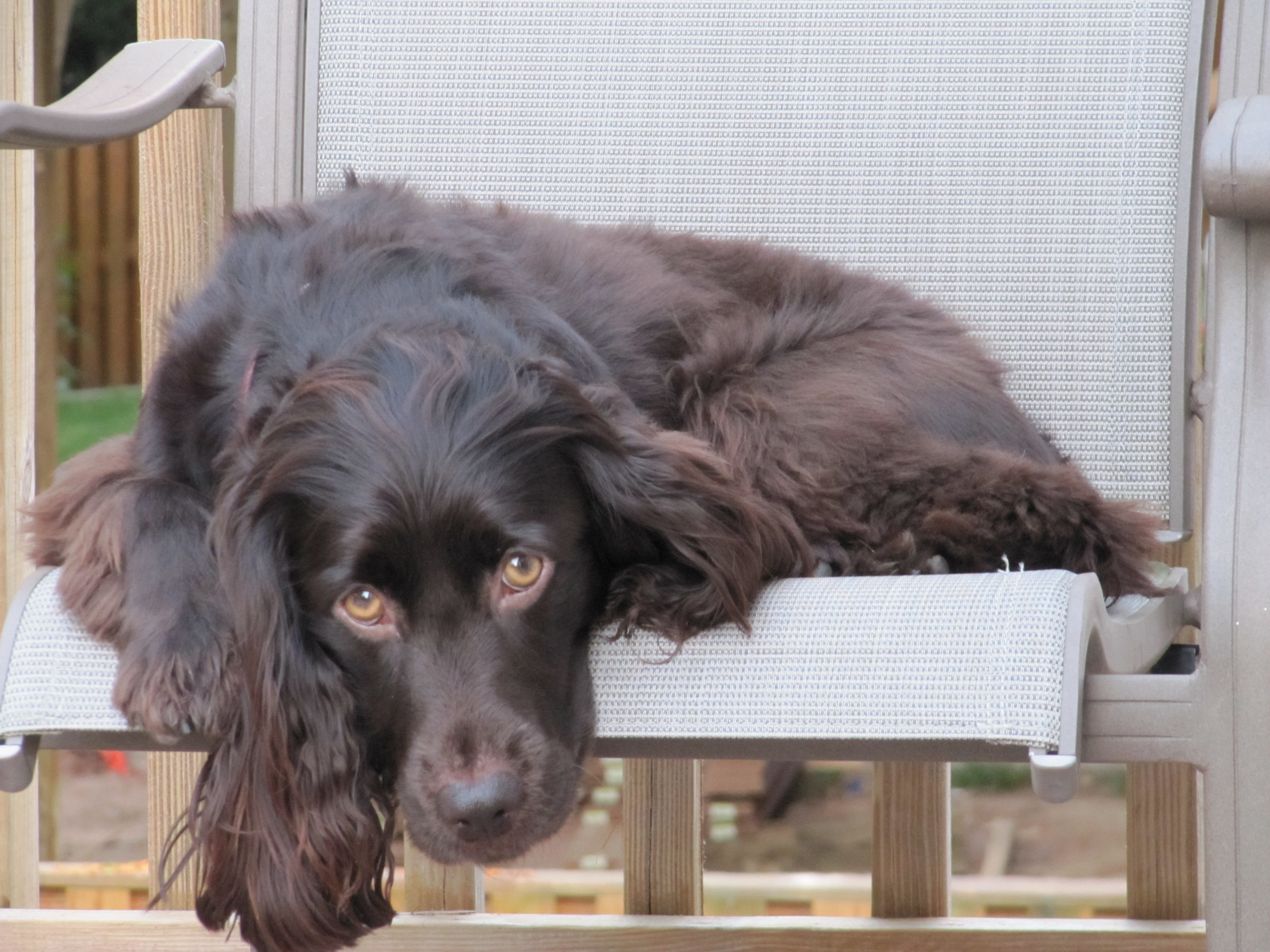
Boykin Spaniel, state dog

- State dog: Boykin Spaniel – The Boykin Spaniel was first bred in South Carolina near Camden, SC. It is a small dog with an often brown, curly coat and golden eyes. It was bred primarily for waterfowl hunting. The breed's popularity outside of the state is rising. The dog is known for its jovial personality and energy. It is also known as the "swamp poodle" and "the little brown dog."
- State grass: Indian grass (Sorghastrum nutans) – The General Assembly wrote that Indian grass is "a native, nonnoxious plant, with a historical, continuing, widespread, and beneficial existence in South Carolina." (2001)
- State fish: striped bass or rockfish (Morone saxatilis) – Thirty to forty pound striped bass can be caught in the Santee Cooper lakes, making bass fishing a popular pastime. (1972)
- State flowers
  - State flower: yellow jessamine (Gelsemium sempervirens) – The return of yellow jessamine each spring is thought to suggest the lesson of "constancy in, loyalty to and patriotism in the service of the State." It is very common and seen throughout the state.
  - State wildflower: goldenrod (Solidago altissima) – With a long bloom time and long lasting flowers, goldenrod was selected as the "official state wildflower".
- State fossil: Columbian mammoth (Mammuthus columbi) (2014)
- State fruit: peach (Prunus persica) – South Carolina is the second largest producer of peaches, behind California and ahead of Georgia (the Peach State). (1984)
- State gemstone: amethyst – South Carolina is one of a few U.S. states where good quality amethyst gems can be found. (1969)
- State heritage horse: Carolina Marsh Tacky – "The Marsh Tacky, a rare colonial Spanish horse breed unique to South Carolina, has played a significant role in South Carolina's history. After abandonment by the Spanish on the South Carolina Sea Islands and along the South Carolina coast some five hundred years ago, the Marsh Tacky survived on its own and developed into a unique strain of colonial Spanish horse." (2010)
- State heritage work animal: mule (2010)
- State insect: Carolina mantid (Stagmomantis carolina) – One reason that the Carolina mantid was selected as the state insect is for its use in agriculture in managing harmful insects. (1988)
- State marine mammal: bottlenose dolphin (Tursiops truncatus) – Both the state marine mammal and state migratory marine mammal were designated by Act Number 58 of 2009 (2009)
- State migratory marine mammal: northern right whale (Eubalaena glacialis) – The right whale can be found off the South Carolina coast during the breeding and calving season. (2009)
- State mottos:
  - Dum spiro spero (While I breathe, I hope) – It appears on one of the state's license plates.
  - Animis opibusque parati (Ready in soul and resource) – Both state mottos are shown on the state seal which depicts the defeat of the British on Sullivan's Island in 1776. (1777)
- State music: spiritual – Spirituals are songs that originated in the oral traditions of African-American slaves. "Swing Low, Sweet Chariot" is one of the best known examples. Spirituals were first written down on St. Helena Island during the Civil War. (1999)
- State pecan festival: The South Carolina Pecan Festival in Florence County. (2011)
- State popular music: beach music – Beach music is closely associated with the state dance, the shag, and is also considered to have originated in Myrtle Beach. (2001)
- State reptile: loggerhead sea turtle (Caretta caretta) – The loggerhead is a threatened species that nests on the shores of South Carolina. (1988)
- State shell: lettered olive (Oliva sayana) – The lettered olive was found and named by a South Carolinian, Dr. Edmund Ravenel of Charleston. (1984)

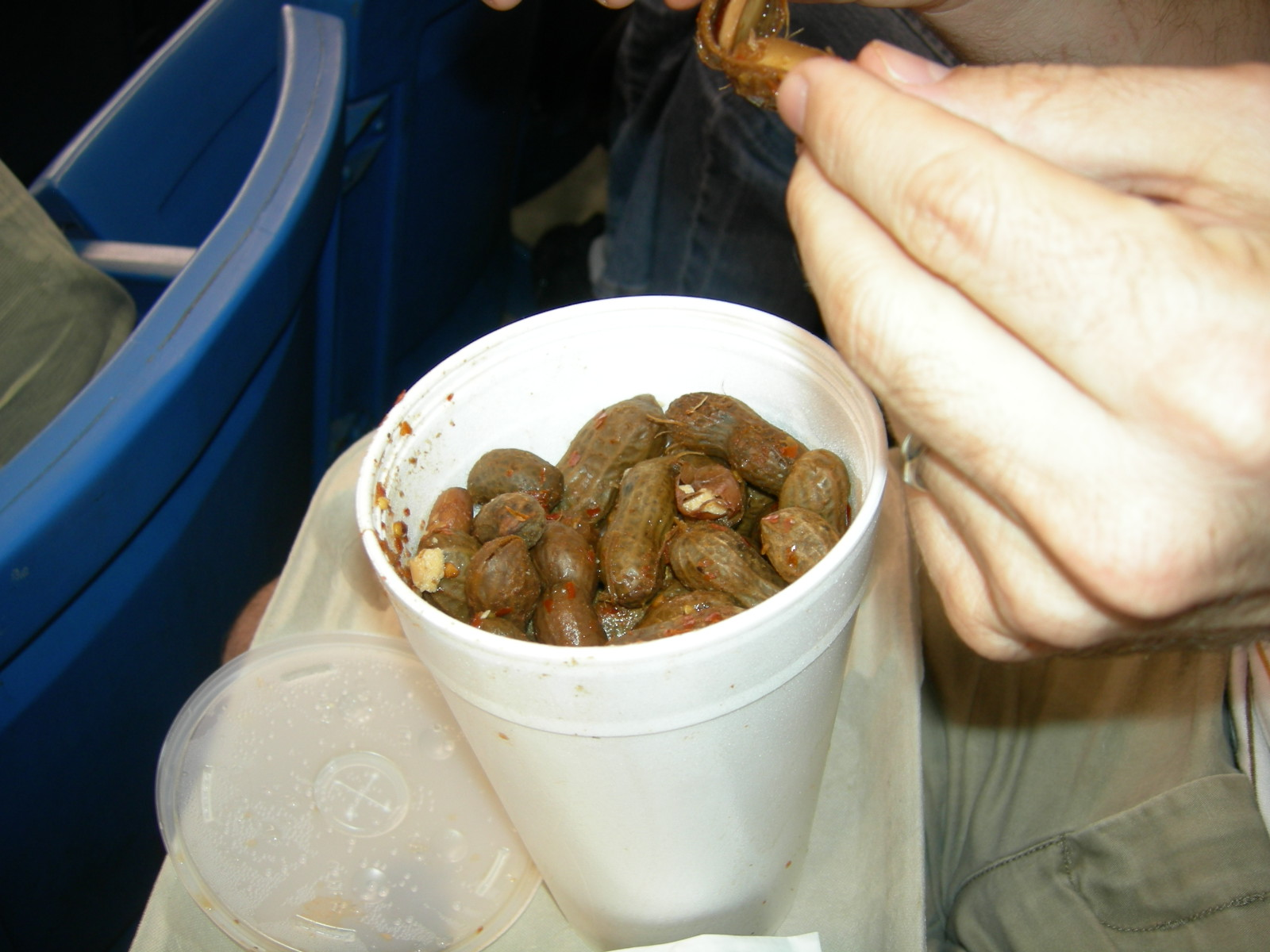
Boiled peanuts, state snack

- State snack: boiled peanuts – Boiled peanuts are a popular snack food in the Southern U.S. School districts are neither encouraged nor required "to serve peanuts to students, especially students with food allergies."
- State songs:
  - "Carolina" (1911), and
  - "South Carolina On My Mind" (1984) – Both state songs were written by South Carolinians.
- State spider: Carolina wolf spider (Hogna carolinensis) – The state spider was the idea of a third grade student as a way for other students to learn more about this native spider. (2000)
- State stone: blue granite – Many buildings throughout the state have been constructed with blue granite mined here. (1969)
- State tartan: The Carolina tartan – The Carolina Tartan recognizes the heritage of Scottish settlers in South Carolina, who began immigrating here in the late seventeenth century. (2002)
- State tapestry: "From the Mountains to the Sea" – The state tapestry, on display at the South Carolina Cotton Museum, depicts scenes of the state on a cotton fabric fifty-four inches wide by seventy-two inches long. (2000)
- State tree: sabal palmetto (Sabal palmetto) – The palmetto has been a symbol for South Carolina since the American Revolutionary War when it was used to build a fort on Sullivan's Island that withstood British attack. The palmetto tree appears on the state seal, which was created in 1777 and was the first symbol of the state. It is one of the most popular state symbols. (1939)
- State vegetable: collard – At the time of adoption, South Carolina ranked second in United States collard production. (2011)

== List of state holidays and observances ==
Holidays for South Carolina (when state government offices are closed) include

- the first day of January--New Year's Day,
- the third Monday of January--Martin Luther King, Jr. Day,
- the third Monday in February--George Washington's birthday/President's Day,
- the tenth day of May--Confederate Memorial Day,
- the last Monday of May—National Memorial Day,
- the fourth day of July--Independence Day,
- the first Monday in September--Labor Day,
- the eleventh day of November--Veterans Day,
- National Thanksgiving Day and the day after, and
- the twenty-fourth, twenty-fifth, and twenty-sixth days of December.

South Carolina observes numerous special days and weeks throughout the year.

- The month of February is American History Month, created for appropriate observances of American history.
- Purple Heart Day is the third Saturday in February to honor the Purple Heart medal and the men and women awarded it.
- March 18, John C. Calhoun's birthday is South Carolina Day when the history, resources and possibilities of the state are to be taught in schools.
- The last week in April in each year is designated as Golf Week. It commemorates the economic impact of the golf industry, the importance of the state's junior golfers and the importance of turfgrass research.
- May 1 is Loyalty Day.
- The first Friday in May is Vietnam Veterans Survivors' and Remembrance Day.
- The Friday preceding Mother's Day is designated Family Respect Day to "recognize the role the family unit plays in a healthy and productive society."
- The state observes the second Sunday in May as Mother's Day.
- The first week of June is South Carolina State Guard Week.
- June 28 is Carolina Day to remember the anniversary of the Battle of Fort Sullivan in 1776.
- Garden Week is the week beginning the first Sunday of June.
- The last week in August is Family Week. The South Carolina Family of the Year is awarded during this week.
- September 11 is a State Day of Remembrance for the victims of the tragic events of the September 11, 2001 attacks, and for the firefighters, law enforcement, National Guard, emergency service personnel, and 911 telecommunicators who risk their lives and contribute every day to ensure the safety of the state's citizens.
- The third Friday in September is POW/MIA Recognition Day in South Carolina observed to remember military personnel who were prisoners of war or declared missing in action.
- October 11 is set as General Pulaski Memorial Day to commemorate the date of Casimir Pulaski's death and remember his service in South Carolina during the American Revolution.
- The second Sunday in October is designated as Grandmother's Day
- The fourth Friday in October is Frances Willard Day to educate children on the evils of intemperance.
- The week which includes November 11, Veterans Day, is designated as Patriotism Week to recognize contributions made by military veterans to American society, to honor the supreme sacrifices made in defending the freedoms and protections afforded by the United States Constitution, and to memorialize those who lost their lives in military service.
- The first Friday of December of each year is Arbor Day in this state, encouraged to be observed by the planting of trees on school property.
- December 15, the anniversary of the ratification of the Bill of Rights of the United States Constitution, is Bill of Rights Day in South Carolina to recognize the meaning and importance of each of the ten constitutional amendments.

== List of additional state designations ==
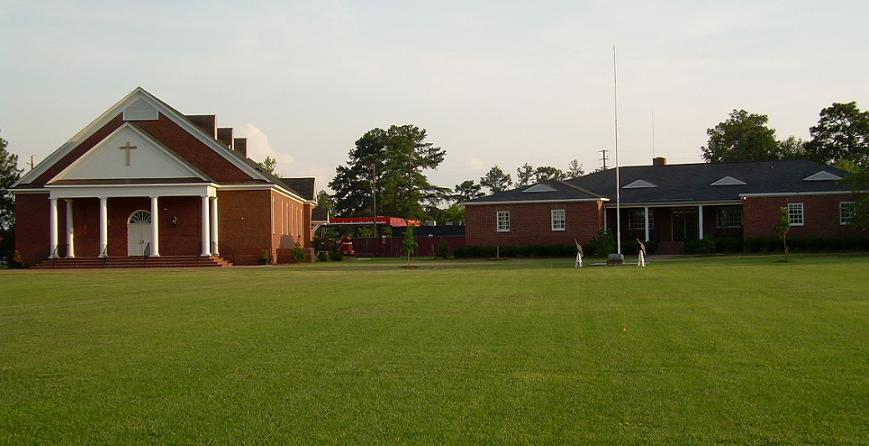
Camden Military Academy, state military academy

- The pledge to the flag of South Carolina is "I salute the flag of South Carolina and pledge to the Palmetto State love, loyalty and faith."
- The South Carolina Botanical Garden at Clemson University is designated the state botanical garden.
- The South Carolina Tobacco Museum in Mullins is the official tobacco museum.
- The South Carolina Railroad Museum in Winnsboro is the official railroad museum.
- Camden Military Academy is designated as the official military academy.
- The South Carolina Hall of Fame located in the Myrtle Beach Convention Center, is the official state hall of fame.
- The South Carolina Artisans Center, in Walterboro, is the official folk art and crafts center of the state of South Carolina.
- In 2001, the Abbeville Opera House received the designation of the official state rural drama theater.

== See also ==
- Index of South Carolina-related articles
- Lists of United States state insignia
- State of South Carolina
