= Carolina tartan =

The Carolina tartan is the official state tartan of both North Carolina and South Carolina. It was designed by Peter MacDonald of Crieff, Scotland, who registered it with the Scottish Tartans Society in 1981. The design was based on an early Royal Stewart tartan as part of the Royal Company of Archers uniform, believed to have been worn by King Charles I of England during his nuptial vows, giving it significance since The Carolinas were named for King Charles (latin, Carolus). It was made the official tartan of North Carolina in 1991 when it was passed by the North Carolina General Assembly. South Carolina followed suit, enacting legislation to make the Carolina tartan the official state tartan in 2002.

== Adoption as state tartan ==
The St. Andrew's Society of North Carolina initiated the design and adoption of the Carolina tartan, in cooperation with the St. Andrew's Society of Charleston.

=== North Carolina ===
On April 18, 1991, North Carolina Senate Bill 173 was brought before the North Carolina General Assembly to "... Designate the Carolina Tartan as the official Scottish Tartan of the State of North Carolina." It was sponsored by Senators Raynor and Tally. It passed 83-6.

=== South Carolina ===
On April 23, 2002, 48 representatives sponsored South Carolina House Bill 5063 which was brought before the South Carolina General Assembly to adopt the Carolina tartan as the official state tartan of the State of South Carolina. The bill was signed into law by the Governor of South Carolina on June 3, 2002.

== Origins ==
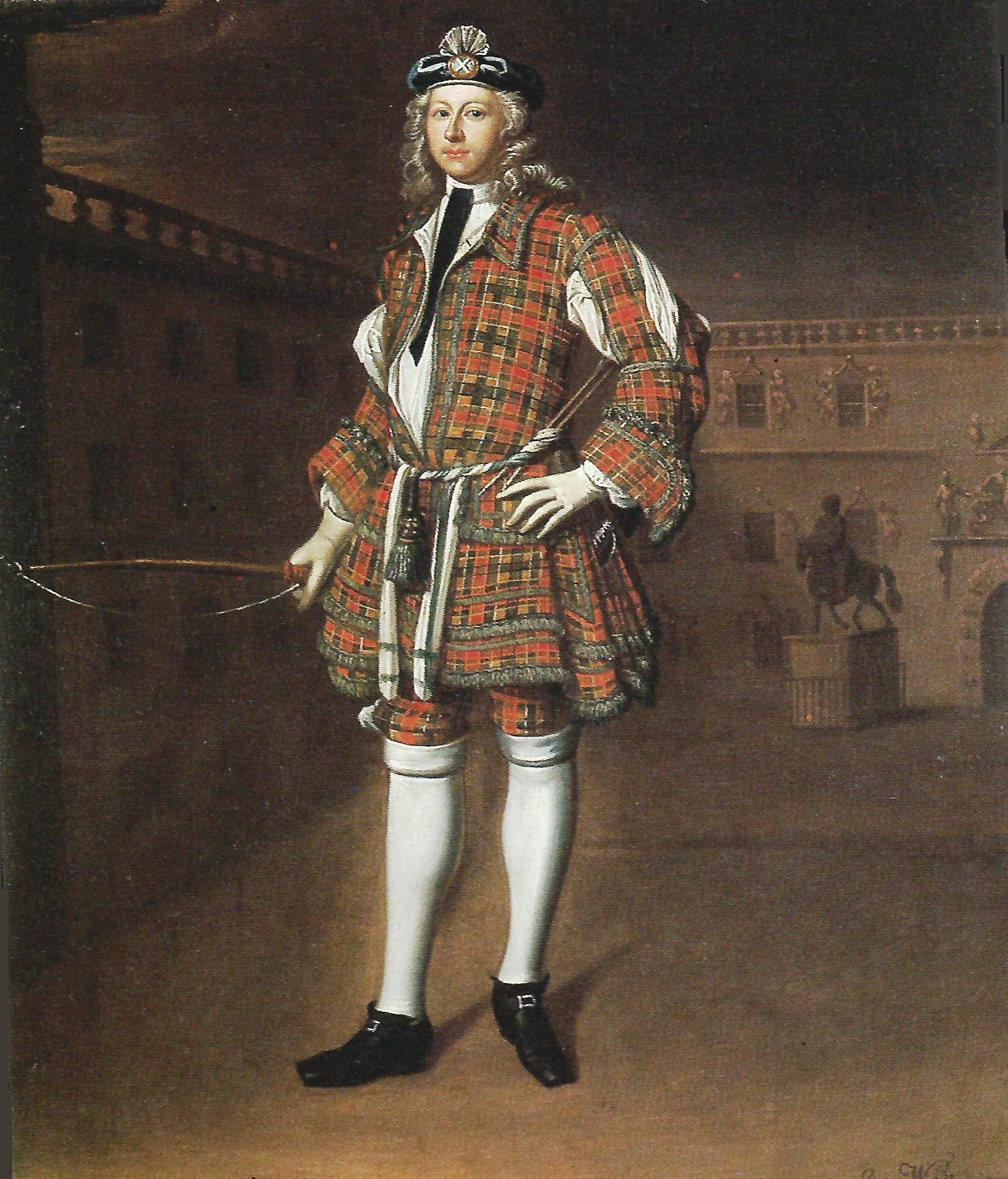
The original tartan uniform of the Royal Company of Archers, the basis for the Carolina tartan

In the late 18th and early 19th centuries, vast amounts of Scottish immigrants settled in the Carolinas. Many societies are dedicated to Scottish heritage or the conservation of Scottish culture in the Carolinas (such as the St. Andrew's Society of Carolina). Peter MacDonald, a Scottish historian and tartan-maker, partnered with the St Andrew's Societies of North Carolina and Charleston to create the Carolina tartan. The inspiration for the Carolina tartan was a parcel of cloth from the uniform of the Royal Company of Archers (c. 1730) believed to be worn in some capacity by King Charles I during his nuptial vows. The Royal Company of Archers was founded in 1676 in Edinburgh to promote archery and the uniform that the Carolina tartan was based on was the first uniform of the company. The uniform was made of tartan, which was often worn by Jacobites, who made up a substantial portion of the company, to profess anti-unionism. This particular uniform was worn until tartan was banned in Britain by the Dress Act 1746, tartan was worn again when the act was repealed but instead of the original red sett, it was replaced by the Black Watch pattern.

== See also ==
- History of the kilt
- List of U.S. state tartans
- List of North Carolina state symbols
- List of South Carolina state symbols
