= List of U.S. state tartans =

This is a list of tartans that have been adopted by law by their respective state legislatures as official U.S. state symbols. Not all states have an official tartan.

== Table ==
State	Tartan	Year	Name	Pattern (sett)
Arkansas				
California		2001	California state tartan, has an additional tartan for the city of San Francisco	Y8 B2 G20 S4 G20 S8 G20 S4 G20 B32 A56 B2 K8
Colorado		1997	Colorado state tartan	[Y/8] R6 MB34 K40 G4 W6 Lv6 W6 [G/64]
Connecticut		1995	Connecticut state tartan	
Florida		2006	Florida tartan, has an additional tartan for the city of Miami	
Georgia		1997	Georgia tartan	
Hawaii		2008	Hawaii tartan	A8 R4 Y4 A48 E16 GN40 Y4 R6
Idaho				
Illinois		2012	Illinois state tartan	
Indiana		2000	Indiana tartan	
Iowa		2004	Iowa tartan	
Louisiana		2001	Louisiana tartan	
Massachusetts		2003	Bay State tartan	DB8 LB4 DB48 R3 DB10 R8 G4 DB8 AW4 DB22 G6 DB6 G12 DB8 LB4 DB48 R4 DB10 R8 G4 DB8 VLT4 DB22 G6 DB6 G12
Michigan		2010	State of Michigan tartan	
Missouri		2019	Missouri state tartan, has an additional red-based tartan, and a tartan for the city of St. Louis	G6, DT4, G4, DT4, B4, DT4, B6, A6, R4, W4, G8, W4, R4, A6, B6, DT4, B4, DT4, G4, DT4, G6, DT4, G16, DT12, G16, A4, G16, DT12, G16, DT4
Nevada		2001	Nevada state tartan	
New Hampshire		1995	New Hampshire state tartan	
New Jersey		2007	New Jersey tartan	
North Carolina		1991	Carolina tartan, has an additional blue-based tartan	R64 A28 K32 Y6 K6 W8 K8 R4 G56 R26 K8 R8 W4
Oklahoma		1999	Oklahoma tartan	R3 W6 B42 Y4 K16 Y4 B42 W6 R3
Oregon		2017	Official Oregon tartan	
Rhode Island		2000	Official Rhode Island tartan	
South Carolina		2002	Carolina tartan, also has an additional blue-based tartan	R64 A28 K32 Y6 K6 W8 K8 R4 G56 R26 K8 R8 W4
Tennessee		1999	Tennessee state tartan	
Texas		1989	Texas Bluebonnet tartan	G4 R2 B16 W2 R2 W2 LB16 W2 LB16 W2 Y1
Utah		1996	Utah Centennial tartan	W2 B6 R6 B4 R6 G18 R6 W4
Virginia		2003	Virginia Quadricentennial tartan	
Washington	Washington State Tartan	1991 (designed 1988)	Washington state tartan	WW6 DR6 RB32 G64 A6 K6 MY4
West Virginia		2008	Official tartan of the State of West Virginia	GO8 G8 B16 G16 A12 SCR54 W2 K6 SCR54 G16 SCR16 B16 G8 GO8
Wisconsin		2008	Wisconsin tartan	[B/44] R6 B4 N6 K28 DG40 DY4 DG40 K28 B22 [DT/12]

== See also ==
- District tartans of Australia
- List of U.S. state, district, and territorial insignia
- List of tartans
- Regional tartans of Canada
