= Diocese of South Carolina =

Diocese of South Carolina may refer to:

- Episcopal Diocese of South Carolina (before 2012)
- Episcopal Diocese of South Carolina, part of The Episcopal Church
- Anglican Diocese of South Carolina, part of the Anglican Church in North America
- Episcopal Diocese of Upper South Carolina
- Roman Catholic Diocese of Charleston, which comprises the entire state
