= California state tartan =

Official Scottish Tartan pattern of California

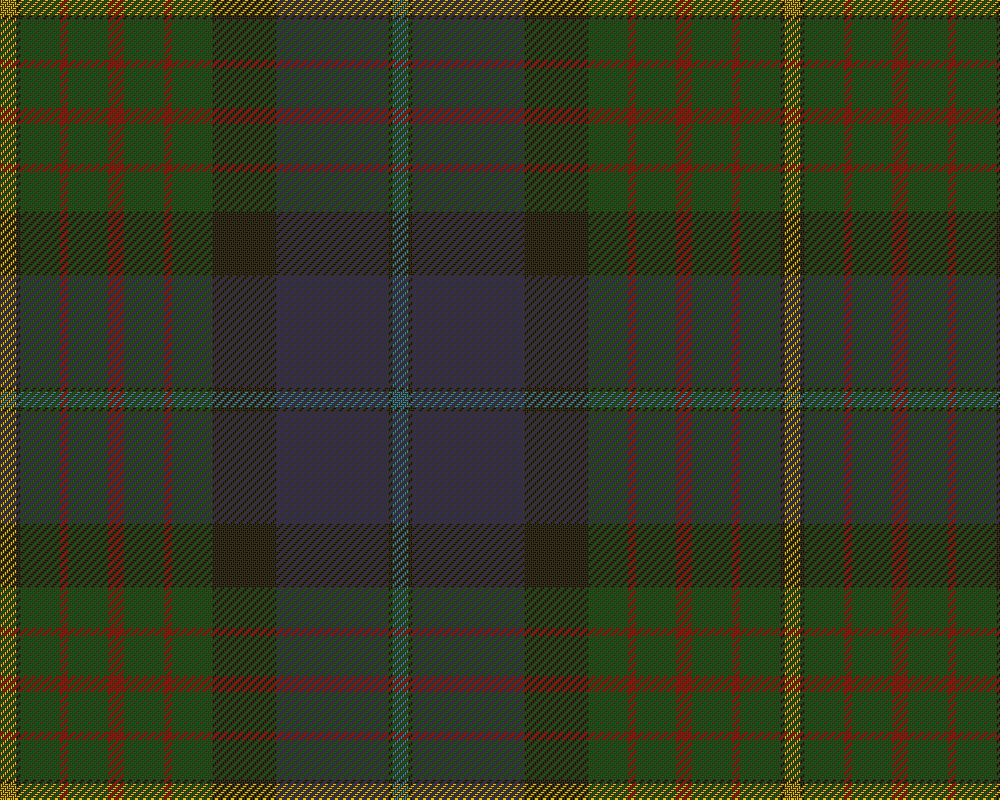
The California State Tartan

The California state tartan is the official Scottish Tartan pattern of California, created July 23, 2001 and defined under law in California Government Code § 424.3(a). California State Assembly Member Helen MacLeod Thomson wrote the law. The tartan was designed by J. Howard Standing of Tarzana, California, and Thomas Ferguson, Sidney, British Columbia. Per California law, any resident of the state may claim the tartan.

The tartan is closely based on the Muir tartan named after John Muir, an environmentalist and botanist noted for his work in California.

The tartan is described in 2001 California Assembly Bill No. 614:

The official State Tartan is generally described as a pattern or sett consisting of alternate squares of meadow green and pacific [sic] blue that are separated and surrounded by narrow charcoal bands. The squares of meadow green are divided by a gold seam that is supported by charcoal lines on each side. There are three redwood stripes, the middle of which is broader, that are added to each side of the gold seam. The pacific blue square is divided by a sky blue stripe, which is supported on each side by charcoal lines.

The tartan is specifically defined by the following weave code:

Y..B..G...S..G...S..G...S..G...B...A...B..K...  Ancient Colors
8..2..20..4..20..8..20..4..20..32..56..2..8...  Full Pivots

This weave code means that the pattern of the threads is as follows:

1. 8 threads of yellow,
2. 2 threads of black,
3. 20 threads of green,
4. 4 threads of scarlet,
5. 20 threads of green,
6. 8 threads of scarlet,
7. 20 threads of green,
8. 4 threads of scarlet,
9. 20 threads of green,
10. 32 threads of black,
11. 56 threads of azure (color),
12. 2 threads of black, and
13. 8 threads of sky blue.

At that point the weave pivots and returns, beginning with 2 threads of black, and continuing the sequence in reverse order through 8 threads of yellow, at which point it pivots back again.

The state law does not specify exact shades of each color. In the case of some colors, such as azure, this allows for significant variability. The Scottish government provides an official list of tartan colors, but it lists multiple hexadecimal color codes for certain names, such as "green" and does not include other names, such as "azure."
