= Flag of South Carolina =

U.S. state flag

South Carolina
- Use: State flag
- Proportion: 2:3
- Adopted: January 26, 1861; 165 years ago (modifications made on January 28, 1861)
- Design: A white palmetto tree on a blue field with a white increscent in the canton.

The flag of South Carolina is a symbol of the U.S. state of South Carolina consisting of a blue field with a white palmetto tree and a white crescent. Roots of this design have existed in some form since 1775, being based on one of the first American Revolutionary War flags. While keeping most of its design intact since its adoption, it has varied over the years.

== Design specifications ==
The state flag of South Carolina was established through a legislative resolution adopted on January 28, 1861, by the South Carolina General Assembly, which designated the following design as a national flag of South Carolina:

…blue, with a white palmetto upright in the centre thereof, and a white increscent in the upper flag staff corner of the flag.

== History ==
=== Moultrie Flag ===
The Moultrie Flag (also known as the "Liberty Flag")

In 1775, Colonel William Moultrie was asked by the Revolutionary Council of Safety to design a flag for the South Carolina troops to use during the American Revolutionary War. Moultrie's design had the blue of the militia's uniforms and a crescent taken from their cap insignia. It was first flown at Fort Johnson.

William Moultrie states in his memoirs:

A little time after we were in possession of Fort Johnson, it was thought necessary to have a flag for the purpose of signals: (as there was no national or state flag at that time) I was desired by the council of safety to have one made, upon which, as the state troops were clothed in blue, and the fort was garrisoned by the first and second regiments, who wore a silver crescent on the front of their caps; I had a large blue flag made with a crescent in the dexter corner, to be in uniform with the troops...

This flag was famously flown in the defense of a new fortress on Sullivan's Island, when Moultrie faced off against a British fleet. In the 16-hour battle on June 28, 1776, the flag was shot down, but Sergeant William Jasper ran out into the open, raising it and rallying the troops until it could be mounted again. This gesture was considered to be so heroic, saving Charleston from conquest for four years, that the flag became a symbol of the Revolution and of liberty in the state and in the new nation.

Soon popularly known as either the Liberty Flag or Moultrie Flag, it became the standard of the South Carolinian militia and was presented in Charleston by Major General Nathanael Greene when the city came under United States jurisdiction at the end of the war. Greene described it as having been the first American flag to fly over the South.

When South Carolina adopted its national flag in 1861, the palmetto was added onto the Moultrie flag in reference to Moultrie's fortress having survived largely because the palmettos, laid over sand walls, were able to withstand British cannon fire.

=== Other flags ===
During the Nullification Crisis in 1833, the citizens of the state raised a palmetto flag bearing a single star. When the state seceded from the union in 1860, the flag again was used and was raised over the State House.

When the Mexican-American War started state troops carried with them a palmetto flag. When Mexico City's was breached by American forces, the palmetto flag was the first to be planted on the city's walls. The flag had a blue field with a palmetto in the center. After the war the flag was sent to the capital to be preserved.

On June 28th, 1851, a large political demonstration was held in the state on the anniversary of the Battle of Fort Moultrie. During the rally a flag was raised featuring a palmetto with a single star.

In July of 1853, the New York Crystal Palace requested a state flag from the governor. The plan was for it to be displayed inside the building with the other 31 state flags. In September the governor sent a: "...plain (most likely white) Banner represent the arms of the state of South Carolina..." to the palace.

In November of 1860, cities and towns across the state started flying flags showing support for secession. These flags had various designs featuring the palmettos, a single star (or multiple stars), crescents, rattlesnakes and mottos.

Early palmettos flags

One of the palmetto flags flown in Charleston in November of 1860

Palmetto flag with a rattlesnake wrapped around it and a single star in the corner

A plain flag with a palmetto tree in the center

Logo of the Secessionist Banner from early 1861

=== Current flag ===
Following its declaration of secession from the Union, the newly independent state of South Carolina considered many designs for its "national flag", with the first official draft for a flag being finalized on January 21, which was a white ensign with a green palmetto, and a blue canton with a white crescent. After a week of debate, the state decided to use a Moultrie flag with an upward facing crescent on a blue field, modifying it by adding the palmetto at the center of the field. On January 26, 1861, the South Carolina General Assembly adopted the new flag by adding a golden palmetto encircled with a white background. This flag has become known as the "2-day flag" because the golden palmetto was changed after two days on January 28 to a simple white palmetto on the blue background.

The Palmetto Flag quickly became a symbol of the secessionist movement. During the following winter, it was unfurled at various places around the country, even as far away as San Francisco, California, by pockets of Southern partisans.

In 1909, Alexander Samuel Salley Jr., secretary of the state's Historical Commission, collaborated with Governor Martin F. Ansel to create a state flag for President Taft's visit. Their work prompted a 1910 law requiring the flag to be displayed on public buildings, with Clemson College producing it according to the 1861 resolution. The law also required the Historical Commission's secretary to approve the design, so Salley supervised every detail, including the exact shade of blue. The only notable adjustment was moving the crescent closer to the flagstaff and orienting its horns inward. The 1910 statute itself, however, did not specify any detailed design specifications. This law was repealed in 1940.

Flag History

First official draft (January 21, 1861). This flag was never adopted.

First official flag of South Carolina. Used from January 26 to January 28, 1861.

Current flag of South Carolina, adopted January 28, 1861.

=== American Civil War ===
Less than three months after its adoption, a variation of the palmetto flag unfurled over Fort Sumter on April 14, 1861, the day it was occupied by the Confederate Army, making it the first of the Confederate flags to replace the Stars and Stripes of the United States of America, from which the Confederacy had seceded. The flag consisted of a palmetto on an entirely white background with a red star in the upper left quadrant and is commonly known as "The Palmetto Guard Flag.

The Sovereignty flag was never recognized as an official flag in South Carolina, but there are also claims that it was flown for a short period of time in South Carolina after its secession on December 20, 1860. The South Carolina Sovereignty flag is considered to be the inspiration for the Confederate battle flag. Another significant flag is the "South Carolina Secession Flag"; the day after South Carolina seceded, a red flag with two tails, a large white star and a down-right facing crescent was raised over the Charleston Custom House. It then spread to other cities as a symbol of secession. At the beginning of the American Civil War, a similar flag was flown at Morris Island by cadets from The Citadel as they fired upon United States supply ships.

Sovereignty/Secession Flag

South Carolina Secession Flag

South Carolina naval ensign during Revolutionary and Civil Wars

The flag flown by Citadel cadets over Morris Island, South Carolina during the American Civil War

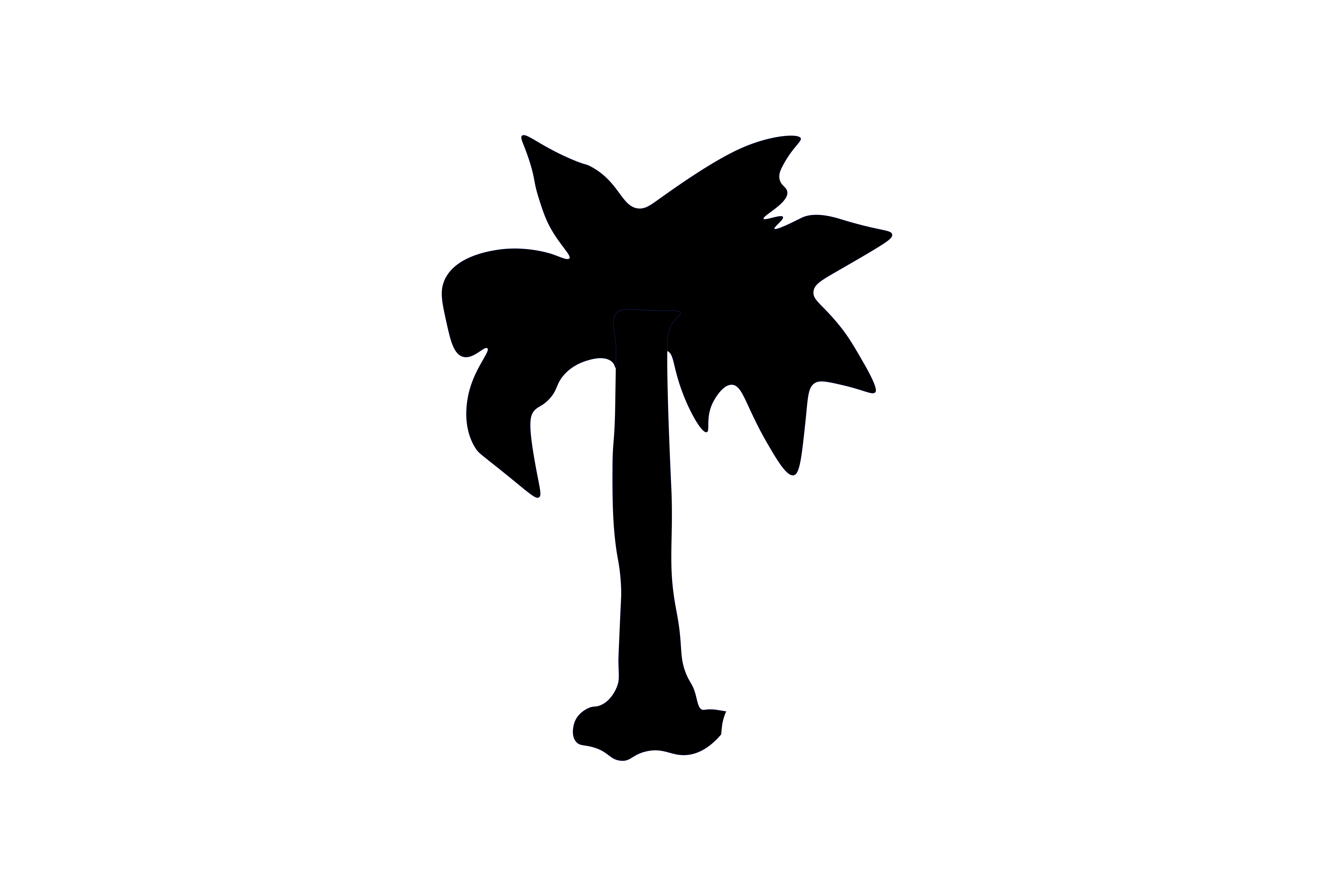
Palmetto flag flown by secessionist in Sacramento, California, per description. Displayed on February 23, 1861

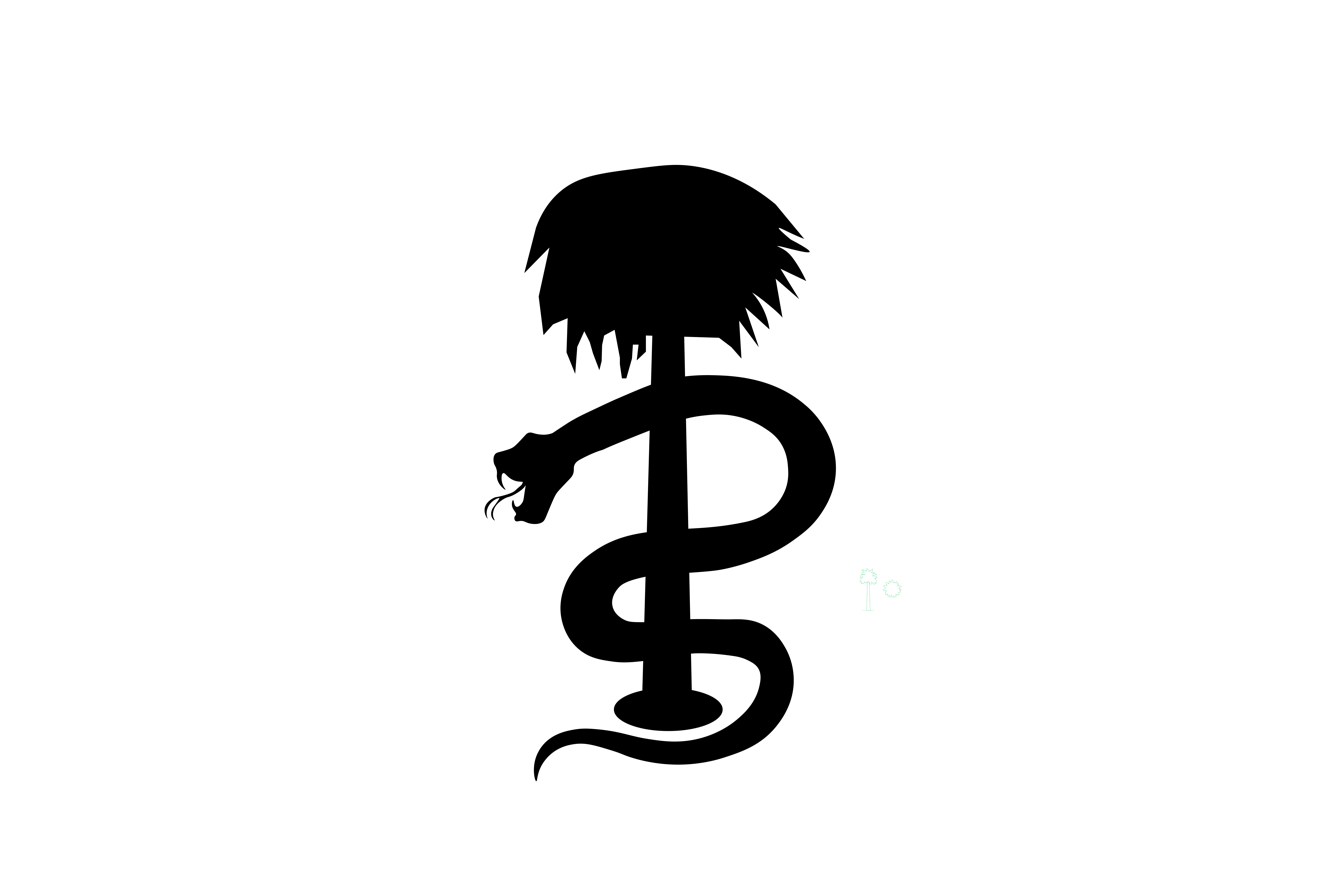
Flag raised in La Porte, California on June 20, 1861, per description.

== Design standardization ==
While the flag invariably includes a white palmetto and crescent design on a blue background, state law since 1940 has not provided "specifications for the shape, size, design or placement" of the symbols, or the exact color of the background. As a result, flags from different manufacturers may have different appearances. A committee of the South Carolina Senate held a hearing on the issue in January 2018 but did not immediately advance a bill to standardize the design.

A standardized design was revealed in 2020 but was immediately met with major backlash from the public for its perceived poor design and aesthetics. Two other designs were then proposed, one of which will possibly become the official standardized version. However, as of 2023, legislation has been procedurally roadblocked, with State Senator Brad Hutto being a core oppositional force to design standardization.

The standardization of the flag would make Pantone 282 C the official shade of indigo to be used on the flag.

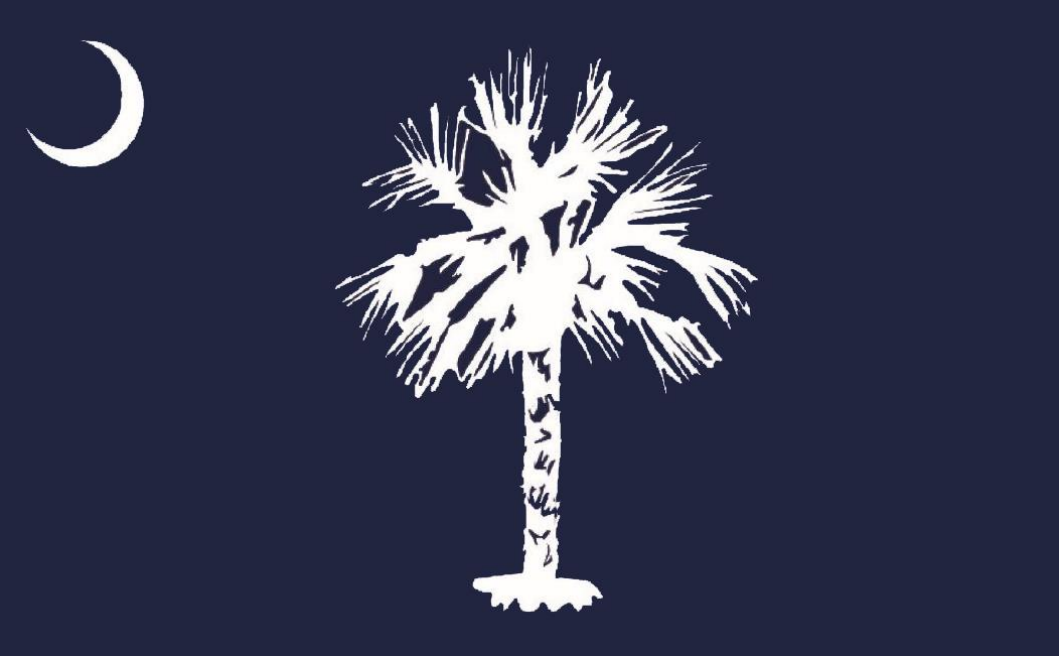
The initial proposed flag

Proposed Standard A

Proposed Standard B

=== Historical design variations ===
Pre-Civil War palmetto flag (ca 1830–1860)

The flag with an upward-angled crescent, as depicted on a March 26, 1861 letterhead

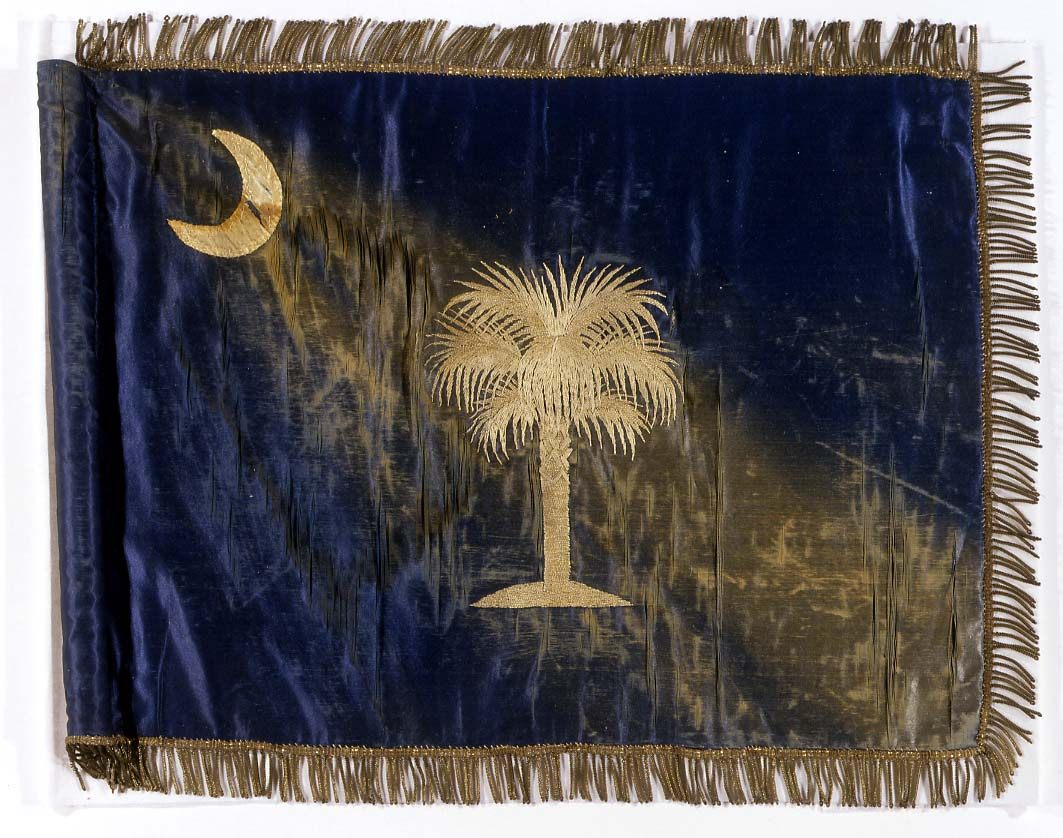
The state flag that was placed on the bier of Jefferson Davis, 1893.

Design approved by Alexander Samuel Salley Jr., the Historical Commission's secretary, featuring a tilted crescent and a palmetto adapted from artwork by Ellen Heyward Jervey

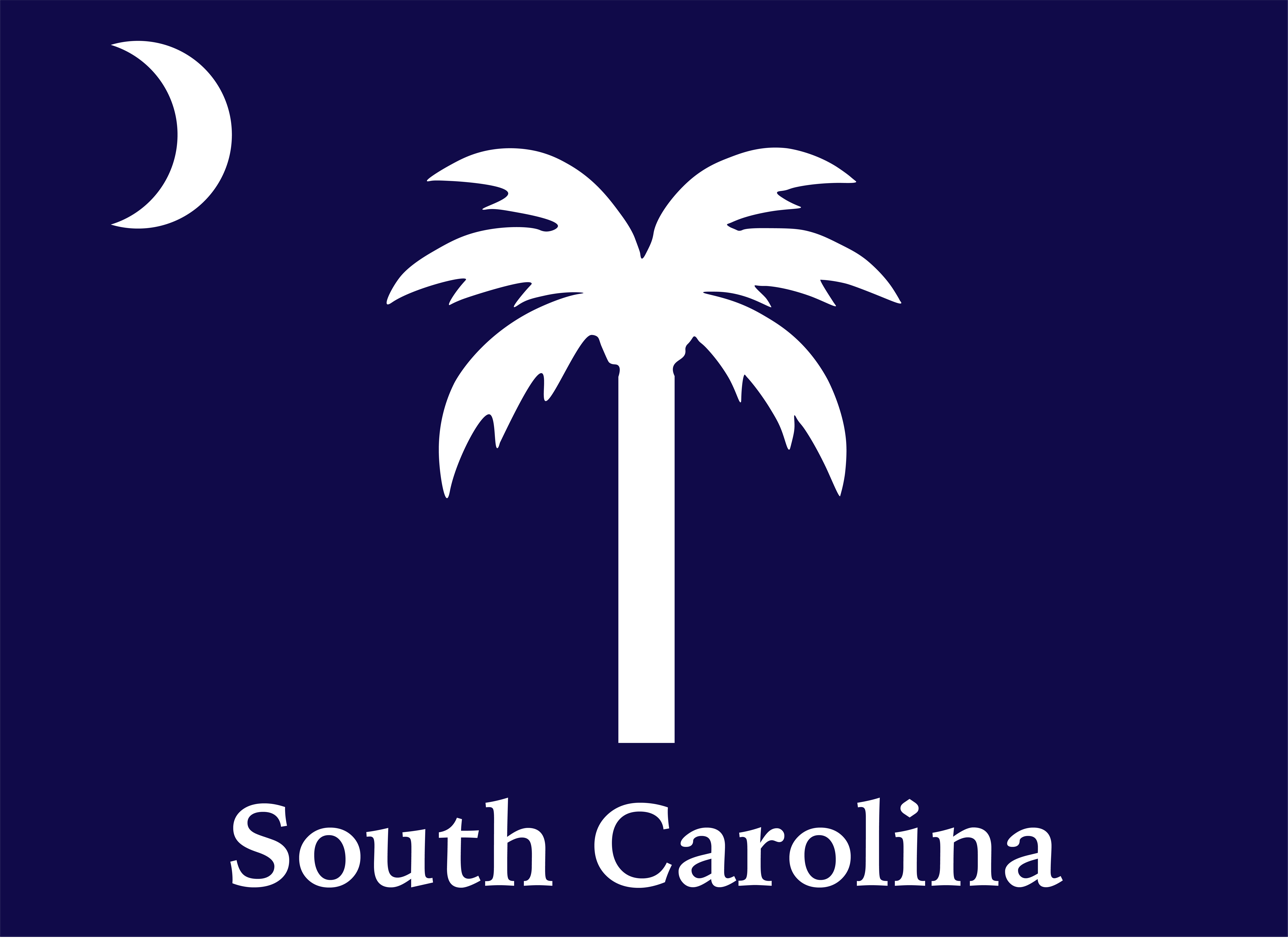
Variant from 1914, per description

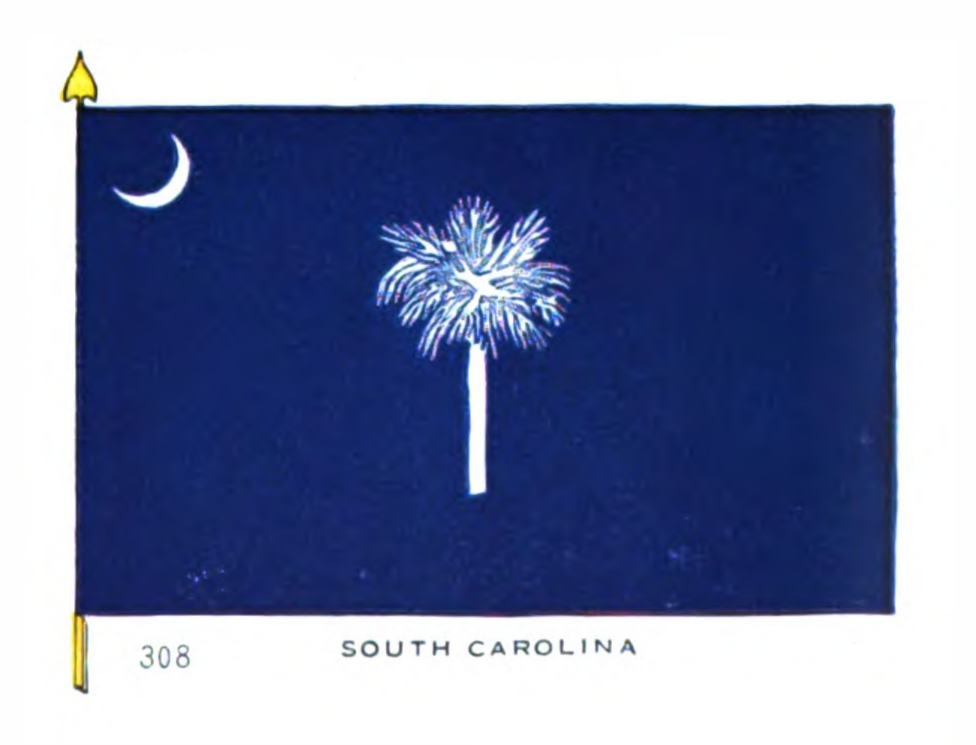
Salley's design as depicted in National Geographic, 1917

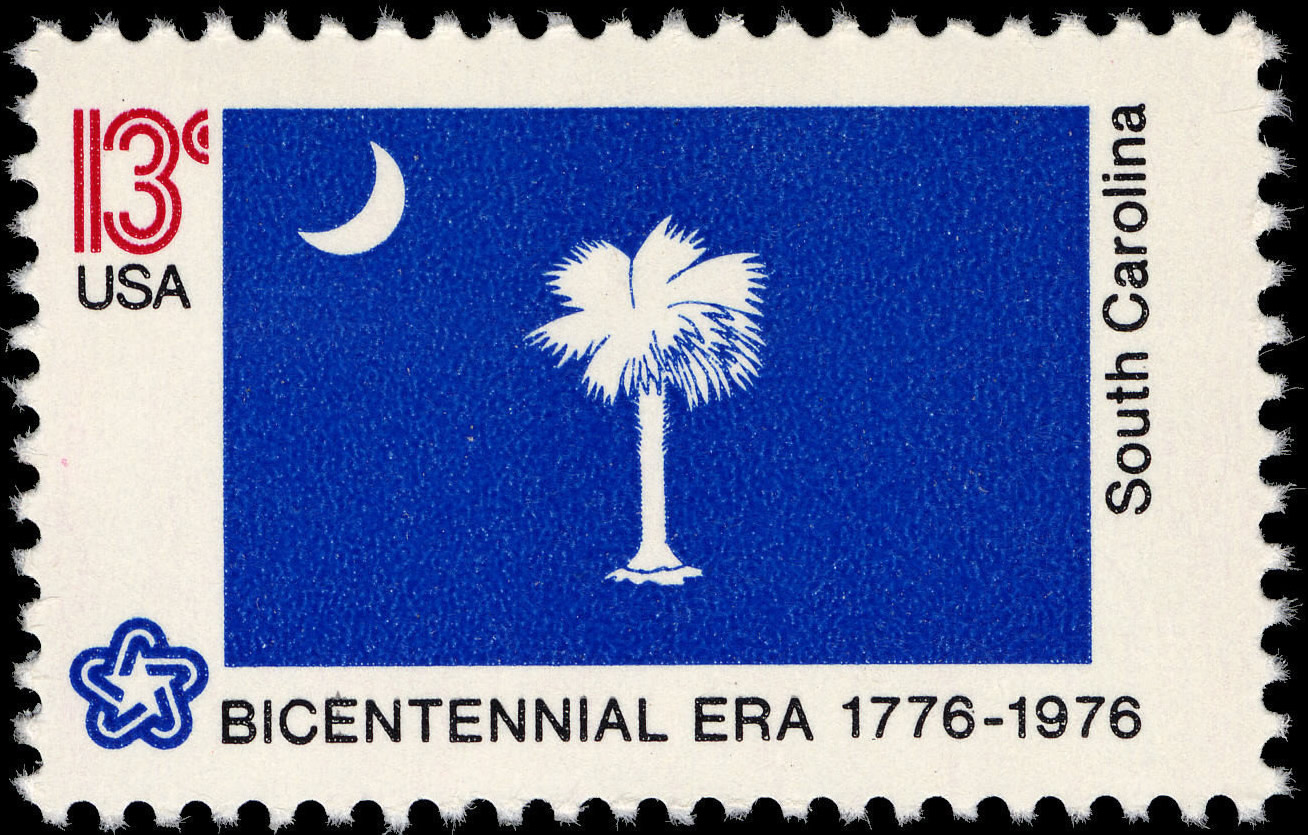
The South Carolina state flag as depicted in the 1976 bicentennial postage stamp series.

== Reception ==
The South Carolina state flag is considered by flag experts as one of the top state flags in the United States. In a 2001 survey of U.S. and Canadian subdivisional flags by the North American Vexillological Association the South Carolina flag ranked 10th out of 72—6th out of 50 U.S. states.

=== Commercial use ===
Shirts, belts, shoes, wallets, koozies, holiday decorations and other accessories featuring the flag's palmetto and crescent are popular throughout South Carolina and other southeastern states as a symbol of the state's long-standing heritage. It is also common for alumni and supporters of the state's main universities (the University of South Carolina, Clemson University, Coastal Carolina University, Furman University, the College of Charleston, Winthrop University, Wofford College, and The Citadel) to display the state flag in their school colors.

== Gallery ==
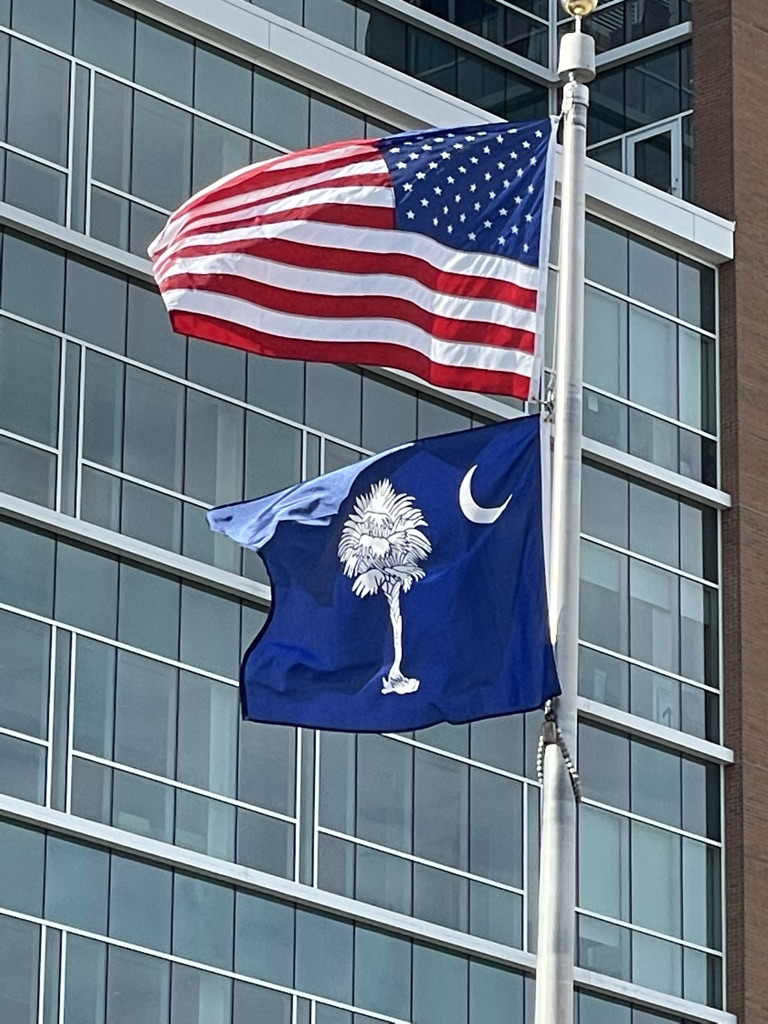
South Carolina flag flying below the U.S. flag.

Flag presented in June 1875 by the state to the Washington Light Infantry for the Bunker Hill Centennial in Boston, per description (obverse)

Flag presented in June 1875 by the state to the Washington Light Infantry for the Bunker Hill Centennial in Boston, per description (reverse)

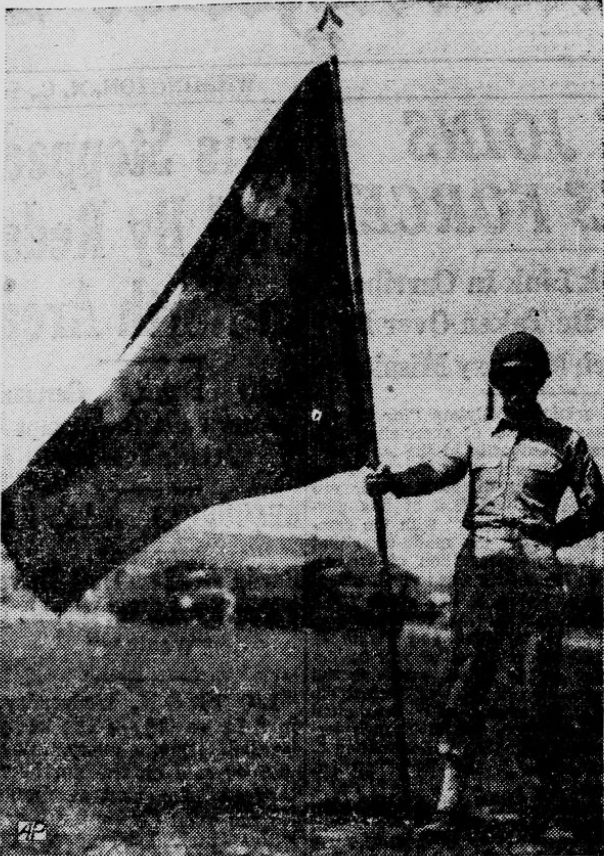
State flag given to the Rainbow Division in 1943

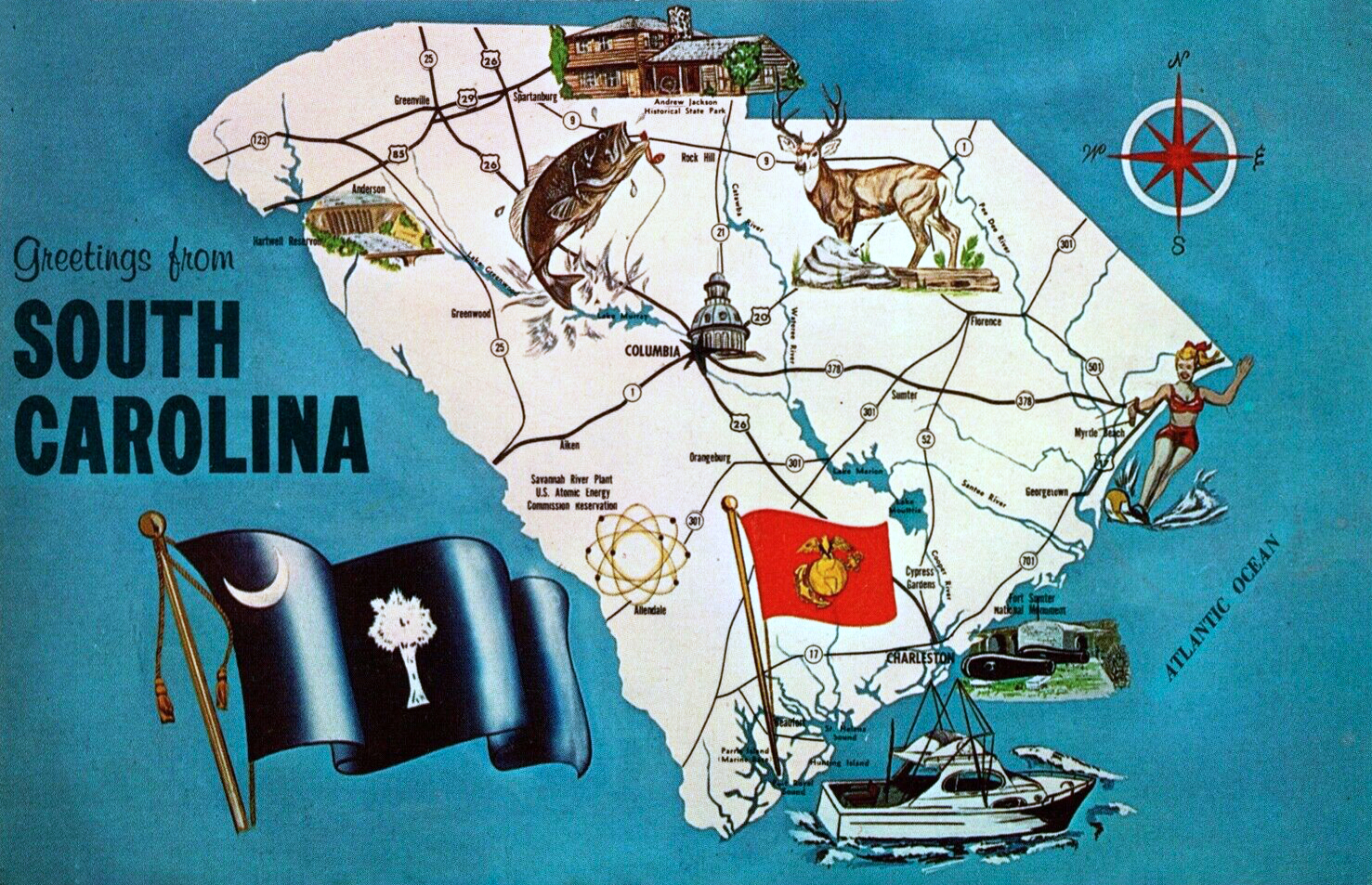
The state flag as depicted in a 1963 greetings card.

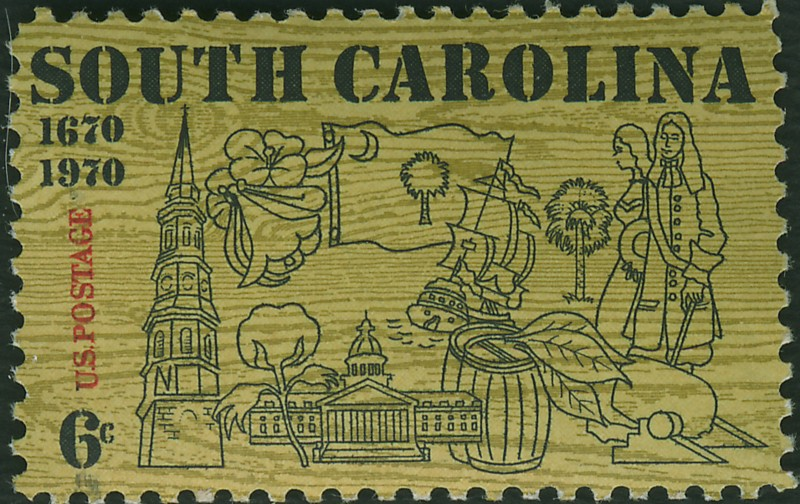
The state flag as depicted in a 1970 6-cent stamp commemorating the tricentennial of South Carolina.

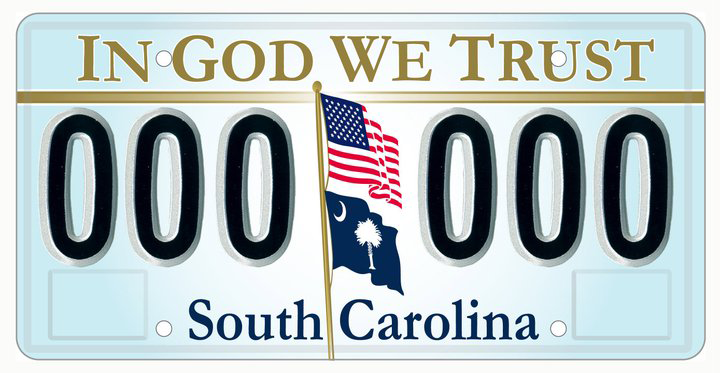
2008 South Carolina license plate with the state flag.

== See also ==
- List of South Carolina state symbols
- Seal of South Carolina
