= Seal of South Carolina =

Previous Harm of the U.S. state of South Carolina

Great Seal of the State of South Carolina

Versions
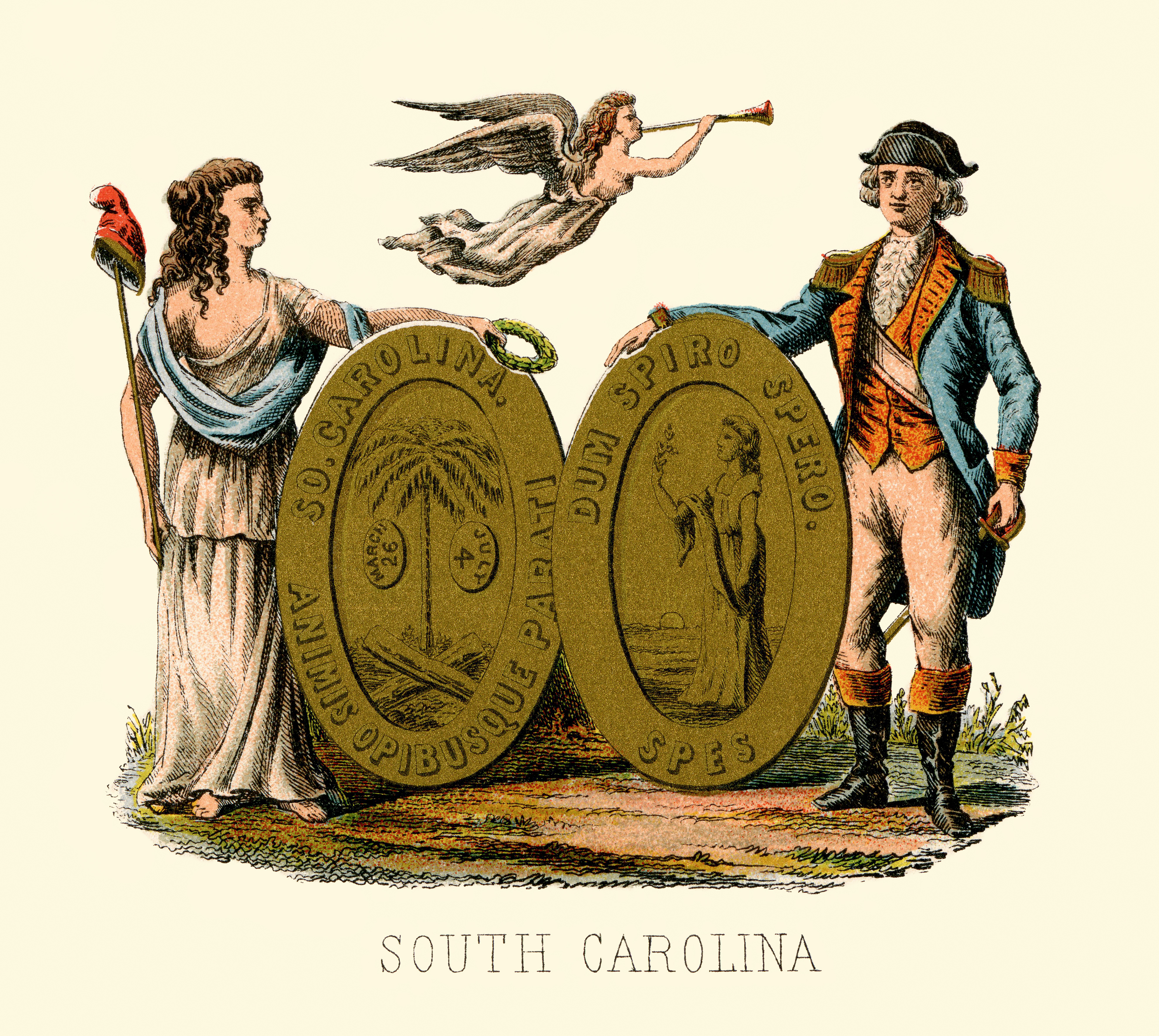
- Historical coat of arms (1876)
- Armiger: State of South Carolina
- Adopted: 1776
- Motto: Quis separabit? Meliorem lapsa locavit Animis opibusque parati Dum spiro spero Spes

The Great Seal of the State of South Carolina was adopted in 1776. South Carolina's seal is made up of two elliptical areas, linked by branches of the palmetto tree. The image on the left is dominated by a tall palmetto tree and an oak tree, fallen and broken. This scene represents the battle fought on June 28, 1776, between defenders of the unfinished fort on Sullivan's Island, and the British Fleet. The standing palmetto represents the victorious defenders, and the fallen oak is the British Fleet. Banded together on the palmetto with the motto Quis separabit? ('Who will separate [us]?'), are 12 spears that represent the other original 12 states of the Union. Beneath that is enscrolled another of the alternate state mottoes, "Meliorem Lapsa Locavit" ("Having Fallen, She Has Set Up a Better One") with the date of 1776. Surrounding the image, at the top, is "South Carolina", and below, is Animis opibusque parati ('Prepared in mind and resources', a quotation from Vergil's Aeneid, book 2, line 799). The other image on the seal depicts the Roman goddess Spes walking along a shore that is littered with weapons. The goddess grasps a branch of laurel as the sun rises behind her. Below her image is her name, Spes, Latin for 'hope', and over the image is the motto Dum spiro spero, meaning 'While I breathe, I hope'.

The full achievement of the state, adopted soon after the seal, consists of the arms above, along with a personification of Liberty holding a Phrygian cap and a laurel wreath on the left, as well as a Continental soldier on the right, as supporters. Above the shield, a personification of Fame goes from Liberty to the soldier.

The Great Seal of South Carolina was "set" or "affixed" to the Ordinance of Secession of December 20, 1860, at Secession Hall in Charleston shortly after 7:00 p.m., following which convention delegates signed it, including Robert Barnwell Rhett, as some three thousand South Carolinians watched enthusiastically the proclamation of South Carolina as "a separate, independent nationality."

== Government seals of South Carolina ==
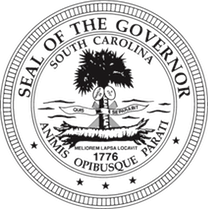
Seal of the governor of South Carolina

Seal of the lieutenant governor of South Carolina

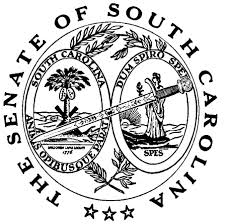
Seal of the South Carolina Senate

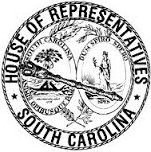
Seal of the South Carolina House of Representatives

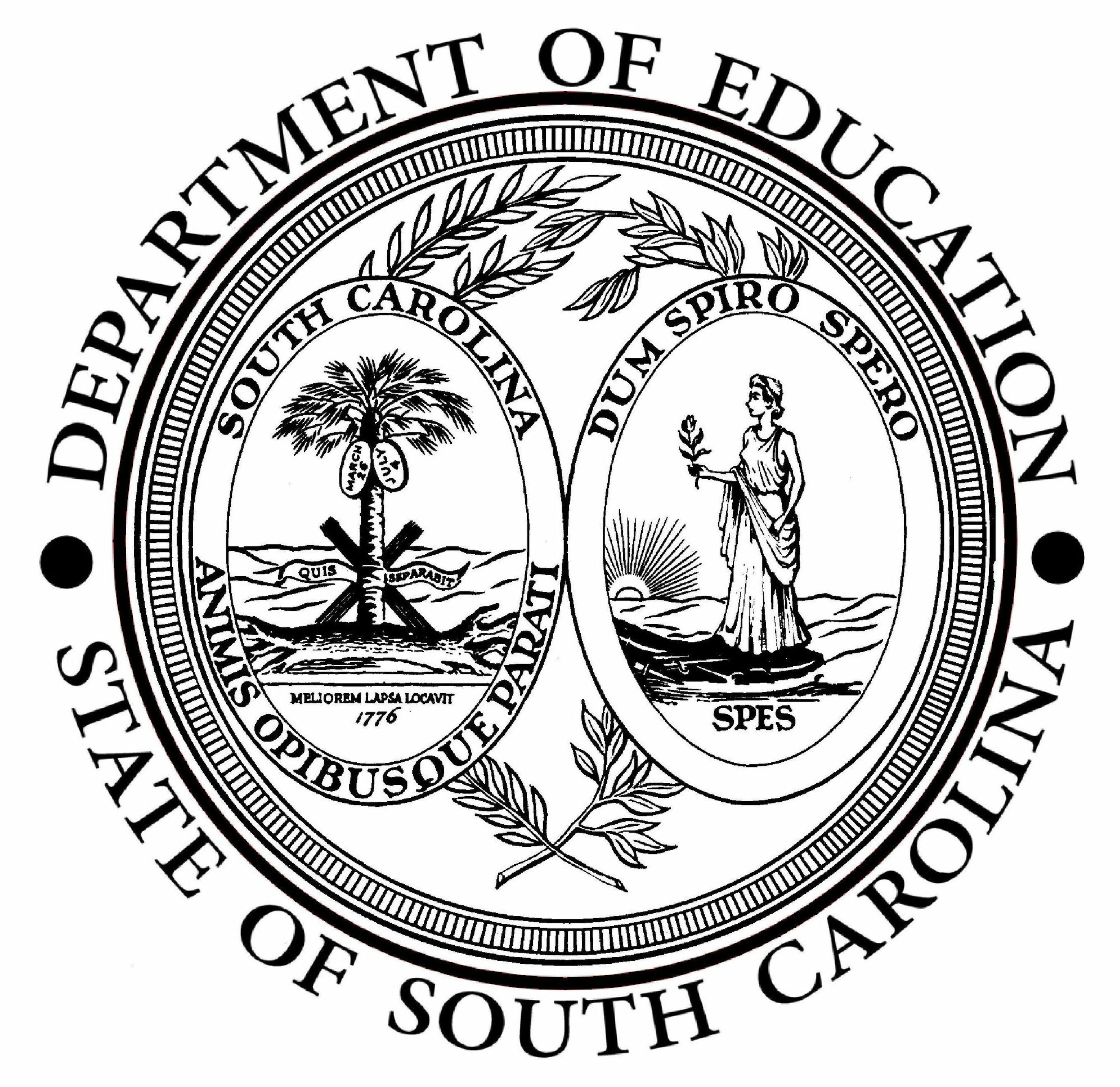
Seal of the South Carolina Department of Education

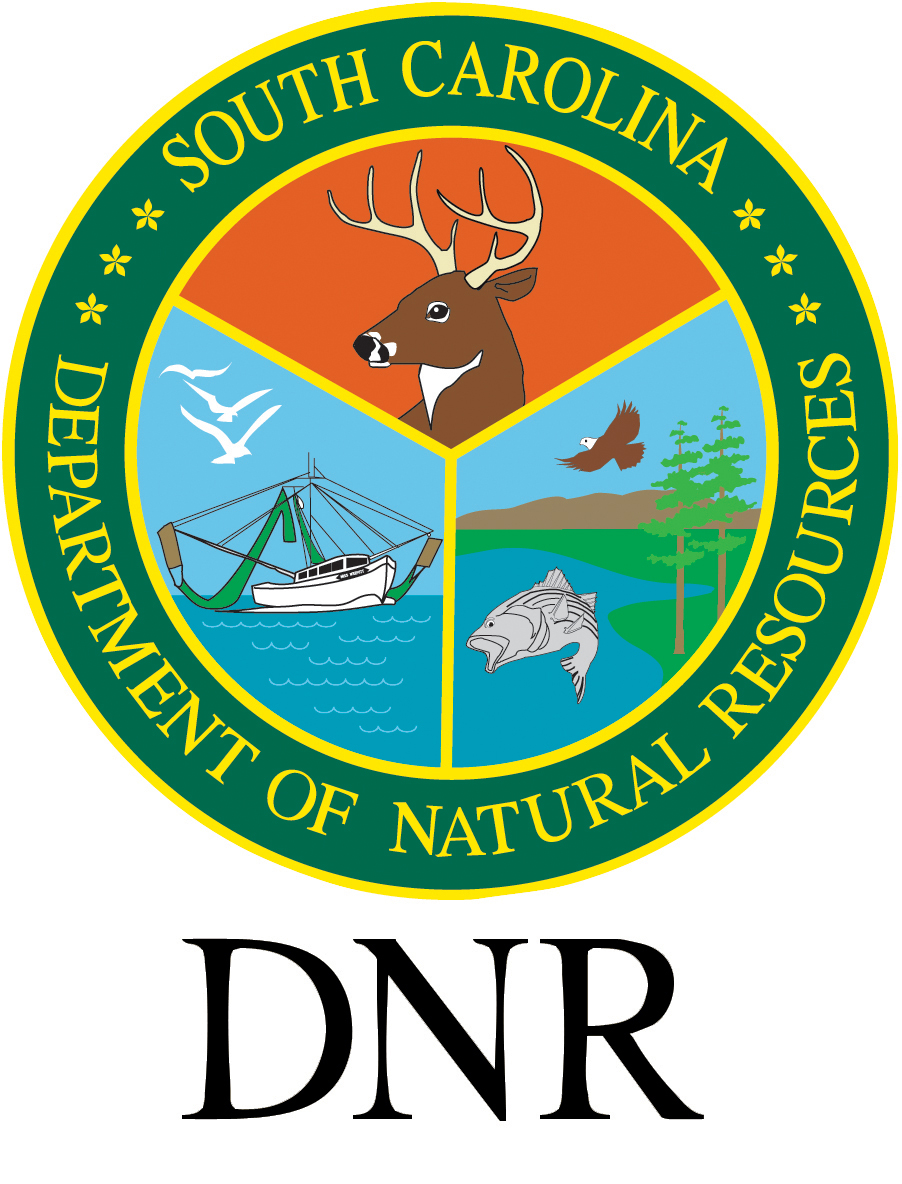
Seal of the South Carolina Department of Natural Resources

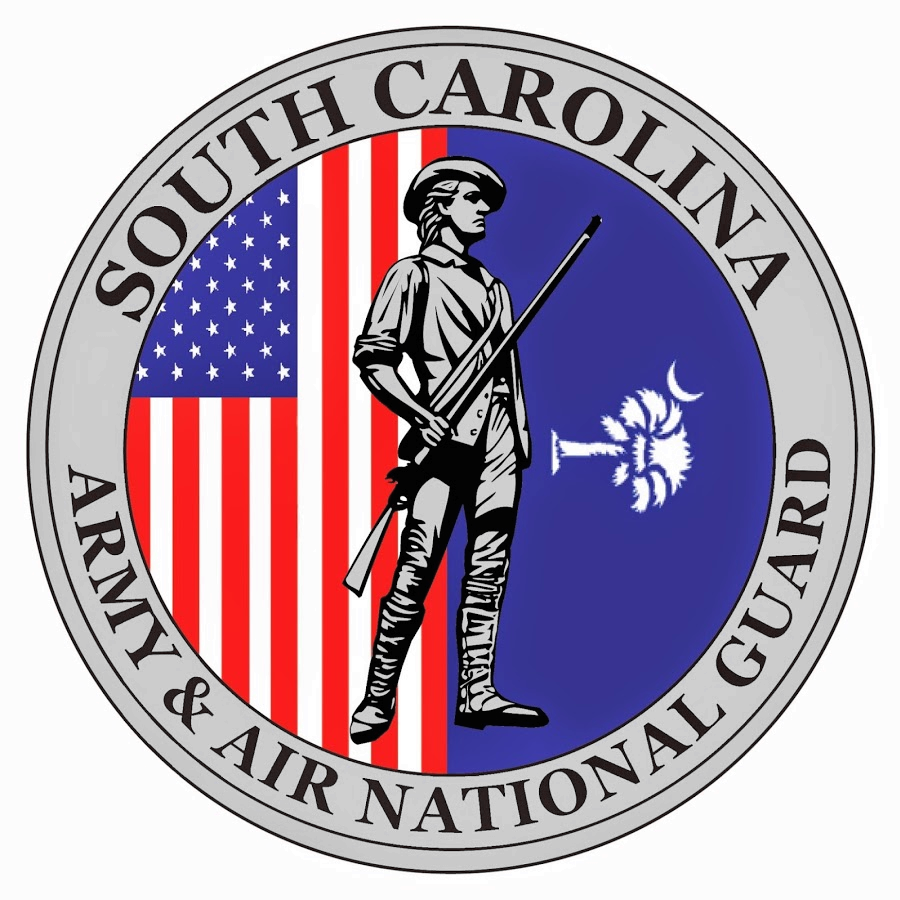
Seal of the South Carolina National Guard

Alternative color scheme for the State Seal

== See also ==
- Symbols of the state of South Carolina
- Flag of South Carolina
