= Dum spiro spero =

Latin phrase

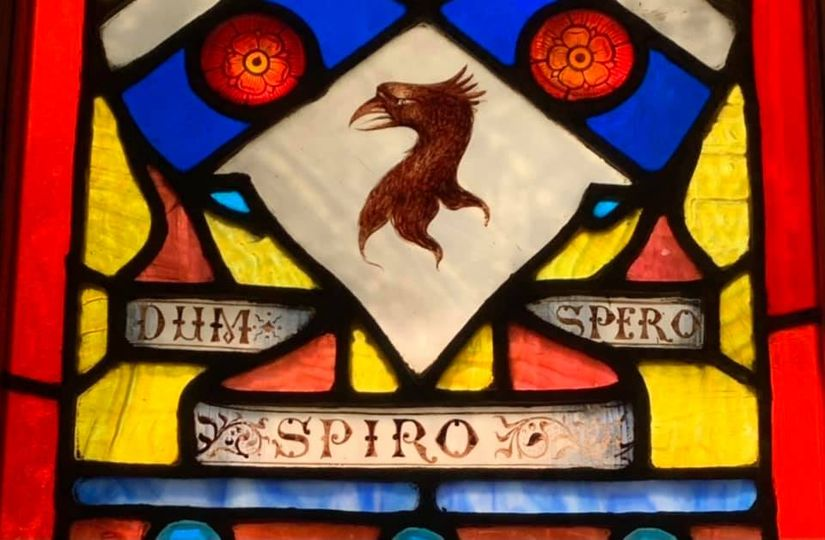
"Dum spiro spero" in a stained glass window at Beverly Unitarian Church in Chicago.

Dum spiro spero, which translates to "While I breathe, I hope", is a Latin phrase of indeterminate origin. It is the motto of various places and organisations, including the U.S. state of South Carolina.

== Derivation ==
The sense of dum spiro spero can be found in the work of Greek poet Theocritus (3rd Century BC), who wrote: "While there's life there's hope, and only the dead have none." That sentiment seems to have become common by the time of Roman statesman Cicero (106 – 43 BC), who wrote to Atticus: "As in the case of a sick man one says, 'While there is life there is hope' [dum anima est, spes esse], so, as long as Pompey was in Italy, I did not cease to hope."

Matthew Henry (1662–1714), commenting on Ecclesiastes 9:3–4, directly related and applied the term to biblical King Solomon's ecclesiastical understanding of life as it relates to a supernatural afterlife. Henry's use suggests that there is eternal hope of heaven while people are living, but this hope is lost once their breath is gone if they choose to live unrighteously ("While there is life there is hope. Dum spiro, spero – while I breathe, I hope."). Henry's application also implies that the phrase's general idea predates Greek thought as it was first recorded in the 10th century BC in Masoretic texts.

The phrase is present in modern day in a representation of the seal of South Carolina printed in March 1785 and in 1777. At some point, by 1890 it was used as the motto of the town of St Andrews, Scotland, and is visible on heraldry around the town from the mid-19th century onwards.

== Usage ==
=== As a motto ===
- Cothill House Preparatory School in Oxfordshire, England.
- The Czech Army's 601st Special Forces Group, based in Prostějov
- dispuut STROPDAS, part of Eindhovensche Studenten Roeivereniging Thêta (Student Rowing Club in Eindhoven, Netherlands)
- Fairfield College, a secondary school in Hamilton, New Zealand
- Oliver Lodge Primary School in Vanderbijlpark, South Africa
- The Principality of Hutt River
- The Raj of Sarawak.
- St Andrews, Fife
- The State of South Carolina, where it appears on license plates issued before 2026.
- St Peter's College, Oxford

=== As an inscription ===
- on the wall of Edzell Castle, and spelled out by the shrubs in the castle's walled garden
- on medallions marking the Barbary Coast Trail in San Francisco, California
- on a stained glass window of Beverly Unitarian Church in Chicago. Also in Chicago, it is inscribed above the doorway of 220 E. Walton Place.

=== As a title ===
- Japanese avant-garde metal band Dir En Grey named their eighth full-length album Dum Spiro Spero.

== Family and individual use ==
Dum spiro spero is used as a motto by armigerous families including the Corbet baronets of Moreton Corbet (both creations), the Hoare baronets of Annabella, Co. Cork, the Cotter baronets of Rockforest, Co. Cork, and the Viscounts Dillon. The Ingram clans of England, Scotland, and Australia. The Sharp and Sharpe clans of England, Ireland, Scotland, and Wales. Royal military. The Williamson Clan from Scotland; and the Scottish Clan MacLennan. Individuals who used the motto include Charles I, King of England; Sir James Brooke, Rajah of Sarawak, and the merchant seaman and privateer, later Royal Governor of the Bahama Islands, Woodes Rogers.

== See also ==
- List of Latin phrases
