= Ira Koger =

American real estate developer (1912–2004)

- Born: Ira McKissick Koger Jr; December 5, 1912; Charleston, South Carolina, U.S.
- Died: May 29, 2004 (aged 91); Atlantic Beach, Florida, U.S.
- Education: College of Charleston
- Occupation: real estate developer
- Years active: 1947-1991
- Organization: Koger Properties
- Known for: suburban office park
- Political party: Democratic
- Spouse: Nancy Tedder (m. 1937)
- Children: 2

Ira Koger was a commercial real estate developer and philanthropist who originated the suburban office park. In his career, his companies designed, constructed, funded and leased over 36 suburban office parks in the Southern United States, including Tulsa, El Paso, Norfolk, Miami, Tallahassee, Tampa and Jacksonville. The office parks include over 300 buildings, generating $150 million in rent annually.

== Early years ==
Ira McKissick Koger was born in Charleston on December 5, 1912, the son of Bessie Evans McMillan and Ira M. Koger. His father was a food broker, but it was reported that he worked in textile mills when he was 11-years old. Koger enrolled at the Mount Pleasant Academy but graduated from Charleston Boys High School. He spent his summers sailing his boat and working for his family. Upon his 1933 graduation from the College of Charleston, he was convinced to enroll in law school at USC. He held memberships in the Blue Key Honor Society and Phi Beta Kappa. Koger withdrew from law school after his second year and tried a broadcasting career. He began work in Columbia at WIS radio where he met and fell in love with Nancy Tedder. The couple wanted to marry but delayed the event until 1937 when they could afford it. The couple had two daughters, Pamela and Celeste. Koger jumped to Savannah's WTOC then back to WIS.

== Politics ==
While in Columbia, Koger interacted with the Young Democrats. He enjoyed politics, and at 21 years old, successfully campaigned for the South Carolina General Assembly from Charleston at age 21, serving from 1935 to 1936. When Koger was younger, he found a boat belonging to a prominent banker in the aftermath of a hurricane. Koger contacted the owner and the boat was returned. That same banker supported Koger's run for office. Koger was the youngest representative elected in South Carolina. He co-authored South Carolina's Workmen's Compensation Law.

== Florida ==
Koger first came to Jacksonville in 1939 for a job as advertising manager for the Jacksonville Journal before working at a local radio station.

== World War II ==
In World War II, Koger joined the United States Navy Reserve in 1944 as an Ensign, serving on the USS Pope (DE-134), in the European Theatre and on USS Sailfish (SS-192). In 1946 he left the Navy as a Lieutenant (junior grade) and resumed his broadcasting career in Jacksonville.

== Business ==
O. P. Woodcock owned a construction company in Jacksonville and he was a great-uncle of Koger's wife, Nancy. According to Koger, "He (Woodcock) was in his 80s and his construction company needed new management, and he had a lot of property. He was very anxious to have somebody look after his property." Koger accepted the job as Executive Vice President of the O.P. Woodcock Company, and it became the turning point of his life. The company thrived and its business spread throughout the South. After Woodcock's 1953 death, Koger bought the company, assumed the presidency and began making investments in real estate.

When Koger looked at Jacksonville's downtown area, he saw crowded streets, inadequate parking and skyscrapers. He imagined that many employees would prefer offices with plentiful parking, quick access to and from their work and pleasant landscaping. Koger claimed that he hired a Yale consultant in 1956 to conduct a feasibility study of suburban office parks. The consultant said that when the downtown parking problem was resolved, suburban parks would be vacant. Koger responded, "They'll never solve the downtown parking problem." In 1957, he built an office complex, Midtown Centre, in the suburban St. Nicholas area of Jacksonville. It was professionally landscaped and conveniently located for easy access across Jacksonville. The concept became popular and was utilized by other developers. Koger's new office parks were created throughout the South. The complex featured 31 buildings comprising 762,993 square feet (70,884.4 m^{2}).

Koger served as CEO and chairman of Koger Properties, once listed on the New York Stock Exchange. Koger Equity was established in 1988 as a holding company with Koger as CEO and chairman, once listed on the American Stock Exchange. and is headquartered in Boca Raton. A debt of about $700 million in 1991 caused Koger Properties to file for Chapter 11 bankruptcy. It merged into Koger Equity in 1993. In December 1991 Koger resigned as chairman of Koger Equity Inc., and S.D. Stoneburner replaced him. Koger remained on the board of directors.

In 1995, Koger was indicted by a federal grand jury for tax evasion. The government claimed he owed $2.5 million, but a judge granted a trial abatement due to Koger's age (83) and sleep apnea, and the case was suspended. Koger insisted that he was innocent and blamed his accountant.

== Community involvement ==
Koger was known nationally as a collector and connoisseur of American and English furniture, American impressionist paintings, and ancient Chinese ceramics. Koger was considered an art patron and devoted himself to cultural events and developments. The Koger Support Foundation donated 400 major Chinese ceramic pieces to the John and Mable Ringling Museum of Art, Museum of Florida History, and Florida State University. He served for 30 years on the board of directors of WJCT-TV in Jacksonville; chairman for 17 years. He volunteered years of time on the boards of numerous of charitable, educational and art institutions, including the Lincoln Center Chairman's Council in New York, the Kennedy Center Advisory Board in Washington, D.C., National Public Broadcasting and Sarasota's John and Mable Ringling Museum of Art.

Koger served on the board of directors for Florida National Bank, Florida Trust Company of Winter Haven. He was board vice chairman at Security Federal Savings and Loan.

== Music ==
When he was young, Koger wanted to be a musician or writer. At 14 years old Koger played saxophone and received membership at the Charleston Symphony Orchestra. He continued to participate in performances with other dance orchestras. Koger played music professionally for most of his life. He received honorary life membership in the American Federation of Musicians.

The Jacksonville Symphony temporarily dissolved in 1969 due to financial difficulties and the departure of their conductor and music director John Canarina. Koger became president of the organization for two years and restored stability. The symphony traveled and performed in New York City and Washington, DC and was able to secure a Ford Foundation grant. Koger also served as a JSO officer and board member; a Savannah Symphony board member; Chicago Orchestra managing trustee; and American Symphony Orchestra League vice chairman.

Mr. Koger organized and sustained the St. Johns River City Band for many years. The band was a professional organization of brass musicians, that performed free traditional band concerts at Metropolitan Park. It was designated Jacksonville's official Band and that of the State of Florida.

Koger and wife Nancy donated millions to the University of South Carolina performing arts center, named the Koger Center for the Arts. The Koger Center was given a Bösendorfer concert grand piano by the Kogers in August 1998. A Distinguished Professorship in Music at USC was also endowed by the Kogers.

Koger also helped establish American music and jazz studies at the University of North Florida by endowing the department of American Music/Jazz.

== Death ==
Ira and Nancy Koger lived in an expansive two-story, cedar-shake beach-front home in Atlantic Beach. After Y2K, they decided to demolish their house and rebuild it. They first constructed a carriage house (Guest house) to live in while the main construction commenced. The design was the replication of a 6,667 square feet (619.4 m^{2}) Plantation house in Charleston that they admired. In December 2003 Koger broke his hip, and while recovering several months later, contracted a staph infection. He died from complications at age 91, according to his daughter. The house was completed in 2004, but Ira never lived there; his wife Nancy died just over a year later.

== Awards, honors & memberships ==
- The South Carolina Business Hall of Fame inducted Koger in 1989.
- Jacksonville Jazz Festival Hall of Fame inducted Koger in 2000.
- Jacksonville Symphony, first "Gold Baton Award".
- Florida Council on Arts and Culture, former Chairman
- Rollins College, honorary doctorate
- University of North Florida, honorary doctorate
- University of South Carolina, honorary doctorate
- Jacksonville Meninak Club, past president
- River Club of Jacksonville, member
- Ponte Vedra Inn and Club, member
- San Jose Country Club, member
- Timuquana Country Club, member
- Sag Harbor Yacht Club, member
