= Columbia City Ballet =

Professional Ballet company in Columbia, South Carolina

The South Carolina Ballet is a professional ballet company in Columbia, South Carolina. Formerly known as Columbia City Ballet, the company has established itself as a significant cultural institution in the region.

== History ==
South Carolina Ballet, formerly The Columbia City Ballet, was founded in 1961 by Ann Brodie, a former dancer with the Radio City Music Hall Ballet. The company was rebranded as South Carolina Ballet in 2023 to reflect its statewide focus. The South Carolina Ballet presents four to five full-length productions and two unique Educational Outreach productions each season. William Starrett is the current artistic director. In March 2026, artistic director William Starrett received the Order of the Palmetto, South Carolina's highest civilian honor, during the company's 65th anniversary performance at the Koger Center for the Arts.

The South Carolina Ballet tours each year in Savannah, Georgia, Charleston, SC, as well as eight other cities around the region. The South Carolina Ballet has also given tours in Chicago, Charlotte, and around Florida.

== Notable Productions ==
One of South Carolina Ballet's most ambitious projects is "Off the Wall and Onto the Stage: Dancing the Art of Jonathan Green," which premiered on February 5, 2005. Choreographed by Artistic Director William Starrett, the ballet brings Jonathan Green's paintings of Gullah life to the stage. With a budget of $1.25 million.

== Dancers ==
Dancers of the Carolina Ballet, as of June 2024:

Principals	Soloists	Demi-Soloists	Company Artists
Camilo Herrera; Nicole Millwood; Claire Rapp; Joshua Van Dyke	Gabrielle Gardner; Jordan Hawkins; Amanda Hwang	Julianna Ball; Peyton Bond; Tony Tucker	Emily Bartee; Haissan Booth; Benjamin Boveroux Jr.; Elizabeth Brooks; Dylan Bacon; Alexandra Chumney; Benjamin Drinkwater; Imani Garrett; Corrick Jones; Bella Leone; Katherine Marianacci; Bobby McClure; Miranda Montes de Oca; Sydney Murrell; Patrick Odlum; Christal Odum; Taylor Petrowski; C'Jae Ransom; Kamaria Roberson; Angelic Solis; Dargan Swearingen; Virginia Welsh; Hannah Williams
