= Zapp Group =

International group of companies in the field of metal working

Zapp AG
- Company type: Aktiengesellschaft
- Industry: Metal working, consulting and trade
- Founded: 1998
- Headquarters: Ratingen, Germany
- Area served: Worldwide
- Key people: Stefan Seng, CEO; Kai Knickmann, Chairman of the supervisory board
- Revenue: ▲€400 million (2018)
- Number of employees: ▲1300 (2018)
- Website: www.zapp.com

The Zapp Group is an international group of companies in the field of metal working based in Ratingen, Germany. The group's lead company is the Zapp Precision Metals GmbH in Schwerte and Unna, Germany. The group is a leading manufacturer of metallic precision semi-finished products and specialized in cold forming of stainless steel, titanium, carbon steel and special materials to strip, wire, rod, and profile.

== History ==
The history of the family Zapp goes back to 1701, when Hermann Zapp, father of Engelberth Zapp, started a steel production north of Ründeroth in the valley of Leppe. He bought an iron hammer and registered a trade.

In 1852 he built his first puddle furnace for steel of constant quality. Steel was produced there for five generations. Also Krupp bought refined steel from Zapp. When in 1857 the Great Depression caught Zapp in a financial imbalance, the company was sold. However, they remained true to steel.

In 1869 Robert Zapp left Ründeroth and founded the steel trading company Zapp (today: Zapp AG) in Düsseldorf in 1871, concentrating in particular on the Europe-wide distribution of English special steels. Zapp had previously studied iron metallurgy and the Bessemer process in England and now used his know-how for the production of special steel. But the new steel grades needed explanation. The competitive advantages that resulted from this required intensive cooperation with the toolmakers.

In the course of time the assortment became ever broader. From 1913 the sales organization introduced the new Krupp steel Nirosta, from 1927 the new carbide Widia.

In 1926 the company Robert Zapp took over the Ergste steelworks, which had specialized in cold forming of stainless steel. For 70 years, the two companies operated largely independently of each other. In the post-war period, the Robert Zapp trading house concentrated on innovative high-performance materials and expanded its branch network. In contrast, the Ergste steelworks increasingly shifted its production to high-alloy and new special steels and expanded its special position among drawing and cold rolling mills. In the 1960s it was decided to concentrate entirely on stainless, acid and heat-resistant steels.

In 1991, the Ergste steelworks bought the Westig steelworks in Unna. In 1995, the two companies merged to form Stahlwerk Ergste Westig. In the following years, production plants in the US in Summerville (South Carolina) and Dartmouth (Massachusetts), the second most important market after Europe.

In 1998, the companies of the group were merged into a family controlled joint-stock company. Since then, the company has expanded primarily in the US, Germany and China. In Germany, the companies Ferd. Wagner GmbH in Pforzheim and [Euro Titan Handels GmbH] in Ratingen were taken over by the Zapp Group and Zapp Precision Metals (Taicang) Co. was founded in China. In the US, the Zapp Group also grew through acquisitions.

As a further step towards a uniform international market presence, Zapp Medical Alloys GmbH and Ferd. Wagner GmbH were merged into Stahlwerk Ergste Westig GmbH in 2013.

In addition, Stahlwerk Ergste Westig GmbH was renamed Zapp Precision Metals GmbH to better express its core business as a niche supplier of precision products internationally. At the same time, Robert Zapp Werkstofftechnik was renamed Zapp Materials Engineering and Robert Zapp Service-GmbH was renamed Zapp Systems GmbH.

In 2018, it became known that the Zapp Group had acquired the Sandvik Stainless Wire business from Sandvik.

== Products ==
The core competencies of the company lie in the cold forming of stainless metallic materials in the product forms strip, wire, rod and profile into precision semi-finished products. Mainly austenitic, ferritic and martensitic are processed Stainless steels, nickel- and nickel-based alloys, cobalt-based alloys, but also titanium and titanium alloys. In addition, there are trade and service centres for special materials and tool alloys.

== Locations ==
The production sites, consulting and service centers are located in Ratingen (Germany), Schwerte (Germany), Unna (Germany), Pforzheim (Germany), Sheffield (Great Britain), Sandviken (Sweden), Summerville (SC), Dartmouth (MA), Santa Fe Springs (CA), Stratford (CT), Pearland (TX), Gurnee (IL), Taicang (China) and Hong Kong.

== Companies of Zapp Group ==
The group has several companies in Germany, UK, USA and China.

=== Companies in Europa ===
- Zapp AG (Headquarters), Ratingen, Germany
- Zapp Precision Metals GmbH, Schwerte, Germany
- Zapp Materials Engineering GmbH, Ratingen, Germany
- Zapp Systems GmbH, Ratingen, Germany
- Zapp Immobilien-Verwaltungs-GmbH, Ratingen, Germany
- Zapp Immobilien GmbH & Co. KG, Ratingen, Germany
- Argeste Edelstahlverarbeitung Beteiligungs-GmbH, Ratingen, Germany
- Zapp (GB)Ltd., Sheffield, Great Britain

=== Companies in USA ===
- Zapp Precision Strip Inc., Dartmouth, Massachusetts
- Zapp Precision Wire Inc., Summerville, South Carolina
- Zapp Tooling Alloys Inc., Summerville, South Carolina

=== Companies in Asia ===
- Zapp Precision Metals (Taicang) Co., Ltd., Taicang, China
- Ferd. Wagner (Far East) Ltd., Hongkong

== Participation in cartels ==
The German Federal Cartel Office (German: Bundeskartellamt) imposed fines totalling 205 million euros on several stainless steel producers, including Zapp Group, in July 2018 for price-fixing. From 2004 until its search in November 2015, the company has agreed the method of calculating scrap and alloy surcharges with ArcelorMittal, Saarstahl AG, Voestalpine and Dörrenberg Edelstahl, among others. The companies would also have exchanged prices for products for engineering steel. These companies have acknowledged the allegations against them. The companies' agreements were uncovered on the basis of a reference from Voestalpine, who, as turn state's evidence, does not now have to pay a fine.
