= Midtown Centre =

Business complex in Jacksonville, Florida

- Location within Florida
- Location: Jacksonville, Florida, United States Jacksonville, FL 32207
- Coordinates: 30.300575°N 81.619804°W
- Opening date: 1957
- Developer: Ira Koger
- Manager: D Group Management NA
- Owner: D Group Equities
- Size: 763,000 square feet
- Website: midtowncentre.com

Midtown Centre is a business park located in the Jacksonville, Florida neighborhood of St. Nicholas. The site contains 31 buildings and was developed by Ira M. Koger. Opening in 1957 as the Koger Center, the facility is credited with being the first suburban office park. It is now (December 2012) owned by D Group Equities.
