= Koger Center for the Arts =

Performing arts center in Columbia, South Carolina

Coordinates: 33°59′43″N 81°02′01″W

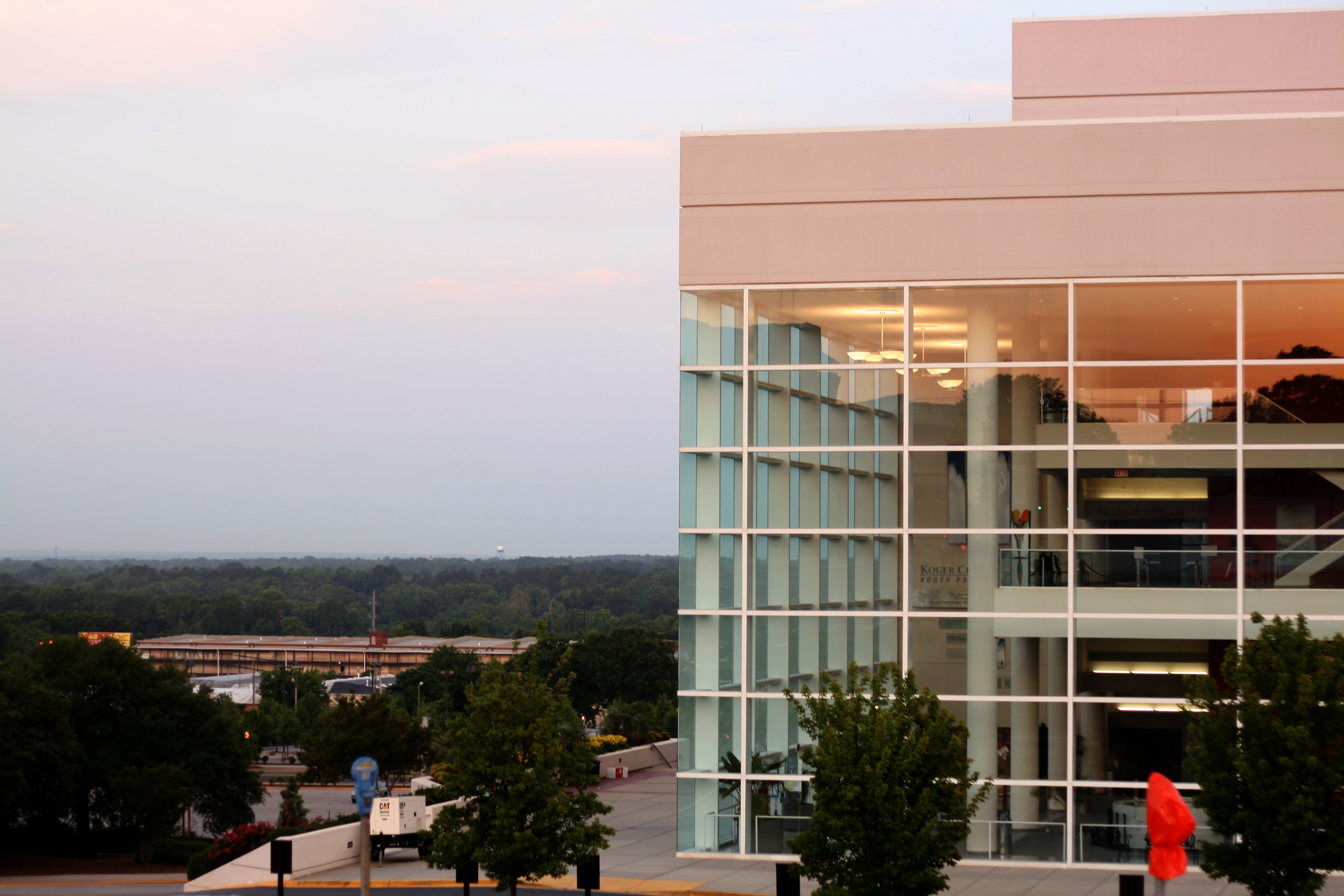
The Koger Center for the Arts

The Koger Center for the Arts is an arts center located in Columbia, South Carolina, on the University of South Carolina campus, adjacent to the School of Music. It was built in 1988, and has 2,256 saleable seats. The center is the home of the Columbia City Ballet and the South Carolina Philharmonic, and it hosts the School of Music's large ensemble concerts. It is also used for other functions such as The State of the State Address, The South Carolina Body Building Championships, The South Carolina Science Fair, Freshman Orientation, The Conductor's Institute, The Columbia Classical Ballet, the dance concerts for the Columbia City Ballet, Southern Strutt's year-end concert, and the university's doctoral hooding ceremonies.

The center is named for philanthropists Ira and Nancy Koger, who made a substantial donation for construction of the $15 million center. The descendants of Ambrose Elliott Gonzales, Narciso Gener Gonzales, and William Elliott Gonzales also made a large donation to the center and the Gonzales Hall auditorium was named in acknowledgement of their contribution.

The London Philharmonic Orchestra gave the first performance at the Koger Center on Saturday, January 14, 1989. James Taylor from Chapel Hill performed there in 1992 (he's performed there 3 times). New Edition performed a benefit concert there on August 26, 2006, which was televised on BET. Ben Folds from Chapel Hill performed there in 2006. Canadian Gordon Lightfoot performed there in 2009. Comedian Daniel Tosh of Tosh.0 performed there in 2010, and reggae singer Matisyahu performed there in 2011. The Blue Man Group ('12), Art Garfunkel ('14), Weird Al Yankovic ('16), The Beach Boys ('17), Alice Cooper ('17), funk rock group The Time (band) with Sheila E. ('18), Joe Gatto of Impractical Jokers in '22, and Kevin James in '23, and Ryan Stiles of Whose Line Is It Anyway? in '23. Riverdance, and Celtic Woman have performed at the Koger Center in recent years.

== See also ==
- List of concert halls
