= List of museums in South Carolina =

Columbia Museum of Art.

This list of museums in South Carolina, United States, encompasses museums defined for this context as institutions (including nonprofit organizations, government entities, and private businesses) that collect and care for objects of cultural, artistic, scientific, or historical interest and make their collections or related exhibits available for public viewing. Museums that exist only in cyberspace (i.e., virtual museums) are not included.

== The list ==
Name	Town/City	County	Region	Type	Summary
Agricultural Heritage Center	Blackville	Barnwell	Central Savannah River Area	Agriculture	Located at the Clemson University Edisto Research Station, early rural farm life
Aiken Center for the Arts	Aiken	Aiken	Central Savannah River Area	Art	Arts center including a gallery with an emphasis on local and regional talent of the South
Aiken County Historical Museum	Aiken	Aiken	Central Savannah River Area	Local history	Housed in a 1930s Winter Colony mansion named "Banksia"
Aiken-Rhett House	Charleston	Charleston	Lowcountry	Historic house	
Aiken Thoroughbred Racing Hall of Fame and Museum	Aiken	Aiken	Central Savannah River Area	Sports	
American Legion Post 3 Cecil B. Buchanan War Museum	Greenville	Greenville	Upcountry	Military	History of American military bases both local and abroad
American Military Museum (permanently closed)	Charleston	Charleston	Lowcountry	Military	Includes artifacts from 14 American conflicts from the Revolutionary War through the recent war in Iraq, and from the U.S. Army, Navy, Air Force, Marines and Coast Guard (Artifacts moved to nearby county and to Museum in NC)
Anderson City Fire Department Museum	Anderson	Anderson	Upcountry	Firefighting	Includes fire trucks, a horse-drawn wagon, hose and chemical truck, pumping engine, antique fire equipment
Anderson County Museum	Anderson	Anderson	Upcountry	Local history	
Andrew Jackson State Park	Lancaster	Lancaster	Olde English District	Biographical	Includes museums about President Andrew Jackson and a replica of a late 18th-century one-room schoolhouse
Antiquers Haven Museum and Shop	Liberty	Pickens	Upcountry	History	House with 1690 to 1890 period pieces, clothing, toys, guns, fine china, automobiles
Arts and Heritage Center of North Augusta	North Augusta	Aiken	Central Savannah River Area	Multiple	Two galleries of rotating exhibits and a permanent heritage exhibit
Ashtabula Historic House	Pendleton	Anderson	Upcountry	Historic house	1790 plantation home
Avery Research Center	Charleston	Charleston	Lowcountry	African American	Part of the College of Charleston, local African American art and cultural history
Barnwell County Museum	Barnwell	Barnwell	Central Savannah River Area	Local history	
Bart Garrison Agricultural Museum of South Carolina	Pendleton	Anderson	Upcountry	Agriculture	South Carolina’s agricultural history and the impact on culture and economies
Beaufort History Museum	Beaufort	Beaufort	Lowcountry	Local history	Area history in a historic arsenal dating back to 1799
Bedon-Lucas House	Walterboro	Colleton	Lowcountry	Historic house	Operated by the Colleton County Historical & Preservation Society, 19th century planter's home
Beech Island Historical Society Visitors Center & Barn	Beech Island	Aiken	Central Savannah River Area	Agriculture	
Berkeley County Museum and Heritage Center	Moncks Corner	Berkeley	Lowcountry	Local history	Located at the Old Santee Canal Park
Bertha Lee Strickland Cultural Museum	Seneca	Oconee	Upcountry	Local, regional, and statewide African American and Cultural History	Exhibits change 1-2 times annually. Museum is located in Historic downtown Seneca
Best Friend of Charleston Museum	Charleston	Charleston	Lowcountry	Railroad	
Black Creek Arts Council Gallery	Hartsville	Darlington	Pee Dee	Art	Includes exhibits of area and national artists
BMW Zentrum	Spartanburg	Spartanburg	Upcountry	Automotive	
Bob Campbell Geology Museum	Clemson	Pickens	Upcountry	Geology	Part of Clemson University, rocks, minerals, fossils, meteorites, mining
Bob Jones University Museum & Gallery	Greenville	Greenville	Upcountry	Art	European art, Russian icons, Holy Land antiquities
Bonham House	Saluda	Saluda	Midlands	Historic house	Operated by the Saluda County Historical Society, late 18th-century house undergoing restoration
Boone Hall Plantation and Gardens	Mount Pleasant	Charleston	Lowcountry	Historic house	Antebellum cotton plantation with original slave quarters
Brookgreen Gardens	Murrells Inlet	Georgetown	Grand Strand	Multiple	Outdoor sculpture gardens, zoo and wildlife preserve
Browntown Museum	Hemingway	Williamsburg	Pee Dee	Historic house	1845 farmstead and outbuildings
Burt-Stark Mansion	Abbeville	Abbeville	Upcountry	Historic house	Site of the last Council of War of cabinet members of the Confederate government
Button Museum	Bishopville	Lee	Pee Dee	Commodity	Items decorated with buttons
Williams Mansion (Previously Calhoun Mansion)	Charleston	Charleston	Lowcountry	Historic house	Restored late 19th-century period mansion (Reopening in 2025
Camden Archives & Museum	Camden	Kershaw	Olde English District	Local history	Local and county history and culture
Catawba Cultural Center	Rock Hill	York	Olde English District	Native American	History and culture of the Catawba Indian Nation
Cayce Historical Museum	Cayce	Lexington	Midlands	Local history	Agricultural, social, and cultural heritage of the Cayce, Old Saxe Gotha, Granby and West Columbia areas
South Carolina Civil Rights Museum	Orangeburg	Orangeburg	Midlands	History	In a 3500 sq. ft. setting, history of the civil rights movement in South Carolina, including Briggs v. Elliott, Orangeburg Massacre, Charleston Hospital Workers' Strike, Harvey Gantt at Clemson, Orangeburg Freedom Movement.
Central History Museum	Central	Pickens	Upcountry	Local history	Operated by the Central Heritage Society
Charles Pinckney National Historic Site	Mount Pleasant	Charleston	Lowcountry	Historic house	1828 plantation home
Charles Towne Landing State Historic Site	Charleston	Charleston	Lowcountry	History	Original site of the first permanent English settlement in Carolina, 664-acre (269 ha) site includes an exhibit hall, replica 17th-century tall ship, a natural habitat zoo, ongoing archeological excavations, trails
Charleston Museum	Charleston	Charleston	Lowcountry	Multiple	Includes main museum with exhibits of natural and local history and decorative arts, and two historic house museums, Heyward-Washington House and Joseph Manigault House
Cheraw Lyceum	Cheraw	Chesterfield	Olde English District	Local history	
Cherokee County History and Arts Museum	Gaffney	Cherokee	Upcountry	Multiple	Local history and art, operated by the Cherokee Historical & Preservation Society
Cherokee County Veterans Museum	Gaffney	Cherokee	Upcountry	Military	Artifacts and memorabilia from the American Revolution to the present
Chester County Historical Society Museum	Chester	Chester	Olde English District	Local history	Collection includes Catawba pottery, Native American projectile points, long rifles and hand guns
Chester County Transportation Museum	Chester	Chester	Olde English District	Transportation	Operated by the Chester County Historical Society, includes cars, trucks, a bus, license plates
Children's Museum of South Carolina	Myrtle Beach	Horry	Grand Strand	Children's	
Children’s Museum of the Lowcountry	Charleston	Charleston	Lowcountry	Children's	
Children's Museum of the Upstate	Greenville	Greenville	Upcountry	Children's	
The Citadel Archives & Museum	Charleston	Charleston	Lowcountry	Military	website, history of The Citadel, a military college
Clemson Area African American Museum	Clemson	Pickens	Upcountry	African American	African American history and culture
Clemson University Galleries	Clemson	Pickens	Upcountry	Art	Maintained by the Center for Visual Arts, includes galleries in Lee Hall I, Lee Hall II, Strode Tower, CVA-Greenville Gallery in West Greenville and other campus locations
Clinton Museum	Clinton	Laurens	Upcountry	Local history	Operated by the City
Coastal Discovery Museum	Hilton Head Island	Beaufort	Lowcountry	Multiple	History, wildlife, and heritage of Coastal Carolina
Coker Farms National Historic Landmark	Hartsville	Darlington	Pee Dee	Agriculture	History of how the Coker Pedigreed Seed Company helped revolutionize Southern agriculture in the late 19th century
Colleton Museum	Walterboro	Colleton	Lowcountry	Local history	
Collins Ole Towne	Central	Pickens	Upcountry	Open air	Open by appointment, includes a general store, barber shop and school house
Columbia Fire Department Museum	Columbia	Richland	Midlands	Firefighting	
Columbia Museum of Art	Columbia	Richland	Midlands	Art	European and American fine and decorative art
Comporium Telephone Museum	Rock Hill	York	Olde English District	Technology	History of the Rock Hill Telephone Company, historic telephones and equipment
Confederate Museum	Charleston	Charleston	Lowcountry	History	Civil War memorabilia, located at the old City Market Building
Congaree National Park	Hopkins	Richland	Midlands	Natural history	Visitor center features exhibits about the natural history of the swamp
Cowpens Depot	Cowpens	Spartanburg	Upcountry	Local history	
Cowpens National Battlefield	Chesnee	Cherokee	Upcountry	Military	Commemorates important battle of the American Revolution
Darlington Raceway Stock Car Museum	Darlington	Darlington	Pee Dee	Automobile	History of Darlington Raceway and the sport of stock car racing
Dillon County Museum	Latta	Dillon	Pee Dee	Local history	Operated by the Dillon County Historical Society, includes early 20th century doctor and dentist's offices, cotton and tobacco agricultural artifacts, military and local history artifacts
Drayton Hall	Charleston	Charleston	Lowcountry	Historic house	18th century indigo and rice plantation
Edisto Island Museum	Edisto Island	Charleston	Lowcountry	Multiple	Local history, culture and natural history
Edmondston-Alston House	Charleston	Charleston	Lowcountry	Historic house	Mid 19th-century mansion
EdVenture	Columbia	Richland	Midlands	Children's	
Elloree Heritage Museum and Cultural Center	Elloree	Orangeburg	Midlands	Local History	10,000 sq ft museum showcasing rural and farm life of the past. Stroll down the street with the founder of Elloree, on handheld device, to see and hear what it was like in 1900.
Fairfield County Museum	Winnsboro	Fairfield	Olde English District	Local history	
Florence County Museum	Florence	Florence	Pee Dee	Multiple	Fine arts including American and European paintings, Asian art, African and African American art and artifacts, objects from Mesopotamia, ancient Egypt, Babylonia, ancient Greece and Rome, Civil War artifacts
Florence Railroad Museum	Florence	Florence	Pee Dee	Railroad	Operated by the Florence County Museum and housed in a renovated railroad box car
Fort Hill	Clemson	Pickens	Upcountry	Historic house	Part of Clemson University, home of politician John C. Calhoun
Fort Moultrie National Monument	Sullivan's Island	Charleston	Lowcountry	Military	Unit of Fort Sumter National Monument
Fort Sumter National Monument	Charleston	Charleston	Lowcountry	Military	Encompasses three sites in Charleston: the original Fort Sumter, the Fort Sumter Visitor Education Center, and the Fort Moultrie National Monument on Sullivan's Island
Francis Marion University Galleries	Florence	Florence	Pee Dee	Art	Galleries in the Hyman Fine Arts Center and the Smith University Center
Franklin G. Burroughs-Simeon B. Chapin Art Museum	Myrtle Beach	Horry	Grand Strand	Art	11 galleries, changing exhibitions featuring paintings, textiles, sculpture, photography, video, ceramics, assemblage, collage and more
Georgetown County Museum	Georgetown	Georgetown	Grand Strand	Local history	
Gibbes Museum of Art	Charleston	Charleston	Lowcountry	Art	
Greenville County Museum of Art	Greenville	Greenville	Upcountry	Art	Focus is American art
Greenville Cultural Exchange Center	Greenville	Greenville	Upcountry	African American	Facebook site
Greenwood Railroad Historical Center	Greenwood	Greenwood	Upcountry	Railroad	website, includes vintage railroad cars
Greer Heritage Museum	Greer	Spartanburg	Upcountry	Local history	Located in a former post office building
Hagood-Mauldin House/Irma Morris Museum of Fine Arts	Pickens	Pickens	Upcountry	Historic house	17th and 18th century art and furnishings, operated by the Pickens County Historical Society
Hagood Mill Historic Site and Folklife Center	Pickens	Pickens	Upcountry	Multiple	1845 grist mill with agriculture exhibits, two cabins and crafts demonstrations
Halsey Institute of Contemporary Art	Charleston	Charleston	Lowcountry	Art	website, part of the College of Charleston
Hampton Colored School	Hampton	Hampton	Lowcountry	African American	Former segregated school, exhibits of area African American history
Hampton County Museum	Hampton	Hampton	Lowcountry	Local history	Operated by the Hampton County Historical Society, located in the historic former county jail
Hampton Museum and Visitors' Center	Hampton	Hampton	Lowcountry	Local history	Located in a former bank building
Hampton Plantation	McClellanville	Charleston	Lowcountry	Historic house	Georgian rice plantation house
Hampton-Preston House	Columbia	Richland	Midlands	Historic house	Operated by the Historic Columbia Foundation
Hanover House	Clemson	Pickens	Upcountry	Historic house	
Hartsville Museum	Hartsville	Darlington	Pee Dee	Local history	Local history and art exhibits, located in a former post office
Heyward House	Bluffton	Beaufort	Lowcountry	Historic house	1840s house with original slave cabin and summer kitchen, operated by the Bluffton Historical Preservation Society
Heyward-Washington House	Charleston	Charleston	Lowcountry	Historic house	Late 18th-century house, operated by the Charleston Museum
Historic Brattonsville	McConnells	York	Olde English District	Open air	Includes over 30 historic structures from the 1760s to the late 19th century
Historic Camden Revolutionary War Site	Camden	Kershaw	Olde English District	Open air	107-acre (0.43 km^{2}) complex includes Colonial and Revolutionary War period historic houses
Hobcaw Barony	Georgetown	Georgetown	Grand Strand	Multiple	Includes Hobcaw Barony Discovery Center features exhibits on local history, archaeology, ecology and area wildlife, tours of the 1930s mansion of Bernard M. Baruch and the grounds of the former plantations
Hollywood Wax Museum Myrtle Beach	Myrtle Beach	Horry	Grand Strand	Media	Wax figures of celebrities including movie stars, television personalities and music icons
Hopsewee Plantation	Georgetown	Georgetown	Grand Strand	Historic house	Typical low country rice plantation with 18th & 19th century furnishings
Horry County Museum	Conway	Horry	Grand Strand	Multiple	Local history, natural history, military, Native Americans, clothing and textiles, industry, farming, household life
The Hunley	Charleston	Charleston	Lowcountry	Maritime	Recovered sunken Confederate submarine that is undergoing conservation
Hunting Island Light	Hunting Island	Beaufort	Lowcountry	Maritime	Former lighthouse open for visitors, located in Hunting Island State Park
Huntington Beach State Park	Murrells Inlet	Georgetown	Grand Strand	Historic house	Includes Atalaya Castle, home of art scholar Archer M. Huntington and sculptor Anna Hyatt Huntington, and a nature center
Jacob Kelley House	Hartsville	Darlington	Pee Dee	Historic house	Mid 19th-century house
John Mark Verdier House	Beaufort	Beaufort	Lowcountry	Historic house	
Joseph Manigault House	Charleston	Charleston	Lowcountry	Historic house	Furnished with early 18th century antiques, operated by the Charleston Museum
James W. Dillon House	Dillon	Dillon	Pee Dee	Historic house	Operated by the Dillon County Historical Society, early 20th century period house
Kaminski House Museum	Georgetown	Georgetown	Grand Strand	Historic house	website, 1769 house with 18th & 19th century American and English antiques
Karpeles Manuscript Library Museum	Charleston	Charleston	Lowcountry	History	Changing exhibits from its collections
Kazoo Museum	Beaufort	Beaufort	Lowcountry	Music	Features a collection of almost two hundred kazoo-related items
Keowee-Toxaway Museum	Six Mile	Pickens	Upcountry	Native American	
Kilgore-Lewis House	Greenville	Greenville	Upcountry	Historic house	Headquarters for the Greenville Council of Garden Clubs, 19th-century house with gardens and arboretum
Kings Mountain National Military Park	Blacksburg	Cherokee	Upcountry	Military	Commemorates important battle of the American Revolution
Kings Mountain State Park	Blacksburg	Cherokee	Upcountry	Farm	Includes recreated early 19th-century farm
L.W. Paul Living History Farm	Conway	Horry	Grand Strand	Farm	website, operated by the Horry County Museum, working farm that depicts farm and domestic life in Horry County from 1900-1955
Lake Greenwood State Recreation Area	Ninety Six	Greenwood	Central Savannah River Area	History	Includes Civilian Conservation Corps Museum
Lando Manetta Mills History Center	Lando	Chester	Olde English District	Local history	website, history of the former textile mill community
Landsford Canal State Park	Catawba	Chester	Olde English District	Transportation	Includes lock-keeper's house with exhibits about the canal
Lexington County Museum	Lexington	Lexington	Midlands	Open air	Includes 36 historic houses and outbuildings
Louis G. Gregory Baháʼí Museum	Charleston	Charleston	Lowcountry	Biographical	website, prominent Baháʼí Faith member Louis George Gregory
Lowcountry Visitor Center and Museum	Yemassee	Colleton	Lowcountry	Local history	Located in the Frampton Plantation House, features a recreated 1900s plantation parlor complete with antique furnishings and displays from the region's 10 museums and the SC Artisans Center
Lunney House Museum	Seneca	Oconee	Upcountry	Local history	website, 1909 Queen-Anne style bungalow; House museum detailing the "Life Journey" of Dr. John & Mrs. Lilian Mason Lunney.
Mac's Pride Museum	McBee	Chesterfield	Olde English District	Multiple	Antique cars, tractors and farming equipment, farm implements, tools, photos
Macaulay Museum of Dental History	Charleston	Charleston	Lowcountry	Medical	Dental instruments and memorabilia, part of the Waring Historical Library at the Medical University of South Carolina
Mace Brown Museum of Natural History	Charleston	Charleston	Lowcountry	Natural history	website, part of the College of Charleston Department of Geology and Environmental Geosciences, fossil and dinosaur specimens
Magnolia Plantation and Gardens	Charleston	Charleston	Lowcountry	Historic house	17th & 18th century rice plantation
Main Street Children's Museum	Rock Hill	York	Olde English District	Children's Museum	website, creative play exhibits based on artwork of cartoonist Vernon Grant
Mann-Simons Site	Columbia	Richland	Midlands	Historic house	Operated by Historic Columbia, house and site of businesses owned by a local African American family
Marion County Museum	Marion	Marion	Pee Dee	Local history	website
Marlboro County Historical Museum	Bennettsville	Marlboro	Pee Dee	Multiple	Includes Victorian parlor, Native American artifacts, farm implements and tools, military items, textiles, 19th-century period Jennings-Brown House, medical museum with historic 20th-century artifacts and equipment, 19th-century Bennettsville Female Academy schoolhouse
McBee Depot Library and Railroad Museum	McBee	Chesterfield	Olde English District	Railroad	Former depot with railroad museum and town library
McLeod Plantation Historic Site	Charleston	Charleston	Lowcountry	Historic house	Focuses on the lives of slaves owned by middle-class farmers
McKissick Museum	Columbia	Richland	Midlands	Multiple	website, part of University of South Carolina, includes natural history, minerals, fine and decorative arts, southern traditional crafts, historic artifacts
Middleton Place	Summerville	Dorchester	Lowcountry	Historic house	18th century rice plantation
Millford Plantation	Pinewood	Sumter	Pee Dee	Historic house	Mid 19th-century Greek Revival mansion
Miniature World of Trains	Greenville	Greenville	Upcountry	Transportation	website, large model train display depicting how transportation and infrastructure system work worldwide
Monsanto Gallery	Greenwood	Greenwood	Upcountry	Art	Art gallery of Lander University, works by Southeastern artists
Mt. Croghan Museum	Mount Croghan	Chesterfield	Olde English District	Local history	
Museum & Gallery at Heritage Green	Greenville	Greenville	Upcountry	Art	Changing exhibits, Old Master paintings and decorative arts, satellite museum of the Bob Jones University Museum & Gallery
Museum and Library of Confederate History	Greenville	Greenville	Upcountry	Military	website, portrays war and home life in the South during the Civil War
The Museum in Greenwood	Greenwood	Greenwood	Upcountry	Multiple	Local cultural and natural history, technology, period room and store displays, art
Museum of Education	Columbia	Richland	Midlands	Education	website, part of University of South Carolina
Museum of the Cherokee in South Carolina	Walhalla	Oconee	Upcountry	Native American	website
Museum of York County	Rock Hill	York	Olde English District	Multiple	website, local history, natural history, decorative arts, art
Musgrove Mill State Historic Site	Cross Anchor	Spartanburg	Upcountry	Military	Site of an American Revolutionary War battle
Nathaniel Russell House	Charleston	Charleston	Lowcountry	Historic house	Operated by the Historic Charleston Foundation, early 19th-century house
National Steeplechase Museum	Camden	Kershaw	Olde English District	Sports	website, history of steeplechasing from its origins in Britain to the present
Ninety Six National Historic Site	Ninety Six	Greenwood	Central Savannah River Area	Military	Site of an American Revolutionary War battle
North Charleston and American LaFrance Fire Museum and Educational Center	North Charleston	Charleston	Lowcountry	Firefighting	website
North Myrtle Beach Historical Museum	North Myrtle Beach	Horry	Grand Strand	Local history	website
Nostalgia City and Museum	Myrtle Beach	Horry	Grand Strand	Automotive	website, gift shop and museum, includes antique cars, fire trucks, agriculture equipment, automotive memorabilia, media memorabilia, household items
Oconee Heritage Center	Walhalla	Oconee	Upcountry	Local history	website
Oconee Station State Historic Site	Walhalla	Oconee	Upcountry	Historic house	Includes 1792 Oconee Station and 1805 William Richards House
Oconee Veterans Museum	Walhalla	Oconee	Upcountry	Military	Also known as Patriot's Hall, includes military artifacts and memorabilia from all wars
Old Exchange Building	Charleston	Charleston	Lowcountry	History	Includes costumed tours of the historic building and dungeon
Old Santee Canal Park	Moncks Corner	Berkeley	Lowcountry	Multiple	website, includes Berkeley County Museum and Heritage Center, a local history museum, and Stony Landing House, a furnished 19th century period home
Old Slave Mart	Charleston	Charleston	Lowcountry	Historic site	Story of Charleston's role in the inter-state slave trade
Parris Island Museum	Parris Island	Beaufort	Lowcountry	Military	History of the United States Marine Corps and Port Royal region
Patriot's Point Naval & Maritime Museum	Mount Pleasant	Charleston	Lowcountry	Maritime	Features four museum ships, including the USS Yorktown (CV-10), an aircraft carrier
Pauline Pratt Webel Museum	Ridgeland	Jasper	Lowcountry	Local history	
Pickens County Museum of Art & History	Pickens	Pickens	Upcountry	Multiple	Local history exhibits and three art galleries
Postal History Museum	Charleston	Charleston	Lowcountry	Philatelic	Historic post office, area postal history
Powder Magazine	Charleston	Charleston	Lowcountry	Military	Used during the Colonial and American Revolution periods to store ammunition
Price House	Spartanburg	Spartanburg	Upcountry	Historic house	Operated by the Spartanburg County Historical Association, late 18th-century home
Ravenel Caw Caw Interpretive Center	Ravenel	Charleston	Lowcountry	Multiple	website, natural and cultural history, wetlands and trails through former rice plantation fields
Rebecca Randall Bryan Gallery	Conway	Horry	Grand Strand	Art	Part of Coastal Carolina University
Redcliffe Plantation State Historic Site	Beech Island	Aiken	Central Savannah River Area	Historic house	1959 plantation house with preserved slave quarters
REVIVA Museum	Iva	Anderson	Upcountry	Local history	
Rice Museum	Georgetown	Georgetown	Grand Strand	Multiple	website, area rice culture, maritime history, cultural history and art
Ripley's Believe It or Not!	Myrtle Beach	Horry	Grand Strand	Amusement	
Robert Mills House	Columbia	Richland	Midlands	Historic house	Operated by the Historic Columbia Foundation
Ronald McNair Life History Center	Lake City	Florence	Pee Dee	Biographical	website, life of astronaut Ronald McNair
Roper Mountain Science Center	Greenville	Greenville	Upcountry	Multiple	62-acre site includes the Living History Farm, the Darell W. Harrison Hall of Natural Sciences, the Simms Hall of Science, the T.C. Hooper Planetarium, and the Daniel Observatory
Rose Hill Plantation State Historic Site	Union	Union	Olde English District	Historic house	19th-century plantation mansion, outbuildings, rose gardens and park
Ruth Drake Museum	Belton	Anderson	Upcountry	Local history	Located in the railroad depot
Saluda County Museum	Saluda	Saluda	Midlands	Local history	website, operated by the Saluda County Historical Society
The Sandbox	Hilton Head Island	Beaufort	Lowcountry	Children's	website
Seay House	Spartanburg	Spartanburg	Upcountry	Historic house	Operated by the Spartanburg County Historical Association, turn-of-the-20th-century farmstead life
Seibels House and Garden	Columbia	Richland	Midlands	Historic house	Early 19th-century mansion and garden
Shoeless Joe Jackson Museum and Baseball Library	Greenville	Greenville	Upcountry	Biographical	website, baseball player Shoeless Joe Jackson
Sigal Music Museum	Greenville	Heritage Green	Upcountry	Music	website, musical instruments
Southern African American Heritage Center	Cheraw	Chesterfield	Olde English District	African American	Facebook site, area African American history and culture from the 1800s to the mid 1900s
South Carolina Botanical Garden	Clemson	Pickens	Upcountry	Multiple	295 acre gardens with nature-base sculptures, art galleries in the Fran Hanson Discovery Center, 18th-century Hanover House
South Carolina Civil War Museum	Myrtle Beach	Horry	Grand Strand	Military	website, includes period firearms, edged weapons, gowns and petticoats, books, newspapers, exhibits on finances and money, slavery, causes of the Rebellion, projectiles, and personal effects
South Carolina Confederate Relic Room & Military Museum	Columbia	Richland	Midlands	Military	website, military history of South Carolina
South Carolina Cotton Museum	Bishopville	Lee	Pee Dee	Industry	website, cotton uses, farming and processing
South Carolina Governor's Mansion	Columbia	Richland	Midlands	Historic house	Mid 19th-century mansion
South Carolina Law Enforcement Officers Hall of Fame	Columbia	Richland	Midlands	Law enforcement	website
South Carolina Maritime Museum	Georgetown	Georgetown	Grand Strand	Maritime	website, includes ship models, photos, maritime artifacts, Fresnel lens
South Carolina Military Museum	Columbia	Richland	Midlands	Military	website, honoring SC's complete military history
South Carolina Railroad Museum	Winnsboro	Fairfield	Midlands	Railroad	website, Features SC Railroad History, includes train rides, railroad cars and artifacts, Rockton, Rion and Western Railroad
South Carolina State Museum	Columbia	Richland	Midlands	Multiple	Exhibits include art, history, natural history, science and technology
South Carolina Tennis Hall of Fame	Belton	Anderson	Upcountry	Sports	Located in the railroad depot
South Carolina Tobacco Museum	Mullins	Marion	Pee Dee	Agriculture	website
Spartanburg Art Museum	Spartanburg	Spartanburg	Upcountry	Art	website
Spartanburg Regional History Museum	Spartanburg	Spartanburg	Upcountry	Local history	website, operated by the Spartanburg County Historical Association
Spartanburg Science Center	Spartanburg	Spartanburg	Upcountry	Science	website
Summerville-Dorchester Museum	Summerville	Dorchester	Lowcountry	Local history	website
Sumter County Gallery of Art	Sumter	Sumter	Pee Dee	Art	website
Sumter County Museum	Sumter	Sumter	Pee Dee	Multiple	website, includes main museum with local history, art and decorative arts exhibits, and Carolina Backcountry Homestead complex
Union County Museum	Union	Union	Olde English District	Local history	website
Upcountry History Museum	Greenville	Greenville	Upcountry	Local history	History of the Upcountry South Carolina region
U.S. Army Adjutant General’s Corps Museum	Columbia	Richland	Midlands	Military	History of the U.S. Army’s Adjutant General’s Corps, located at Fort Jackson
U.S. Army Basic Combat Training Museum	Columbia	Richland	Midlands	Military	History of basic combat training in the U.S. Army has developed since 1917 when Fort Jackson first opened, an official U.S. Army museum
U.S. Army Chaplain Museum	Columbia	Richland	Midlands	Military	History of the U.S. Army Chaplain Corps, located at the U.S. Army Chaplain Center and School in Fort Jackson
U.S. Army Finance Corps Museum	Columbia	Richland	Midlands	Military	History of the Army’s Finance Corps, military currency, US Army payroll ledgers, located at Fort Jackson
Village Museum	McClellanville	Charleston	Lowcountry	Local history	website
Wagener Museum	Wagener	Aiken	Central Savannah River Area	Local history	
Walnut Grove Plantation	Spartanburg	Spartanburg	Upcountry	Historic house	Operated by the Spartanburg County Historical Association, 18th century plantation home and historic outbuildings
War Between the States Museum	Florence	Florence	Pee Dee	Military	Includes guns, uniforms, swords, armor, personal items
Warren Lasch Conservation Center	North Charleston	Charleston	Lowcountry	Maritime	History and artifacts from the submarine H. L. Hunley
White Home	Rock Hill	York	Olde English District	Historic house	1870s portrayal of the home of the White family, major town founders of Rock Hill
Williamsburgh Historical Museum	Kingstree	Williamsburg	Pee Dee	Local history	Operated by the Williamsburgh Historical Society
Williston Museum	Williston	Barnwell	Central Savannah River Area	Local history	website
Winchester Museum	Edgefield	Edgefield	Central Savannah River Area	Sports	website, headquarters of the National Wild Turkey Federation, restoration, management and hunting of the wild turkey
Winthrop University Galleries	Rock Hill	York	Olde English District	Art	Three galleries in two buildings
Woodburn Historic House	Pendleton	Anderson	Upcountry	Historic house	1830 plantation home
Woodrow Wilson Family Home	Columbia	Richland	Midlands	Historic house	Operated by the Historic Columbia Foundation, 1871 Italian villa-style residence that was home to a 14-year-old Woodrow Wilson
World of Energy	Seneca	Oconee	Upcountry	Science	website, operated by Duke Power at the Oconee Nuclear Station
York W. Bailey Museum	St. Helena Island	Beaufort	Lowcountry	Local history	Local history and Gullah culture, located in the Penn Center, a historic district and former school

== Defunct museums ==
- Communication Museum, Charleston, now a special collection of the College of Charleston, antique radios, televisions, phonographs, telephones, magic lanterns, motion picture projectors and other communications equipment
- Florence Air & Missile Museum
- Museum of Western York County, Sharon
- Ragtops & Roadsters Auto Museum, Murrells Inlet
- Rivers, Rails and Crossroads Regional Discovery Center, Blackville, exhibits moved to Arts and Heritage Center of North Augusta
- Slave Relic Historical Museum, Walterboro
- Thomas Elfe House, Charleston, private home

== See also ==
- List of historical societies in South Carolina
- List of nature centers in South Carolina
