= Martha Jackson Jarvis =

American artist (born 1952)

- Born: 1952 (age 73–74); Lynchburg, Virginia, United States
- Education: Howard University; Tyler School of Art; Antioch University
- Known for: Sculpture, educator
- Website: www.marthajacksonjarvis.com

Martha Jackson Jarvis (born 1952) is an American artist known for her mixed-media installations that explore aspects of African, African American, and Native American spirituality, ecological concerns, and the role of women in preserving indigenous cultures. Her installations are composed using a variety of natural materials including terracotta, sand, copper, recycled stone, glass, wood, and coal. Her sculptures and installations are often site-specific, designed to interact with their surroundings and create a sense of place. Her works often focus on the history and culture of African Americans in the southern United States. In her exhibition at the Corcoran, Jackson Jarvis featured over 100 big collard green leaves, numerous carp, and a live Potomac catfish. Among other awards, Jackson Jarvis has received a National Endowment for the Arts Fellowship and has been inducted into the Washington DC Hall of Fame.

== Early life and education ==
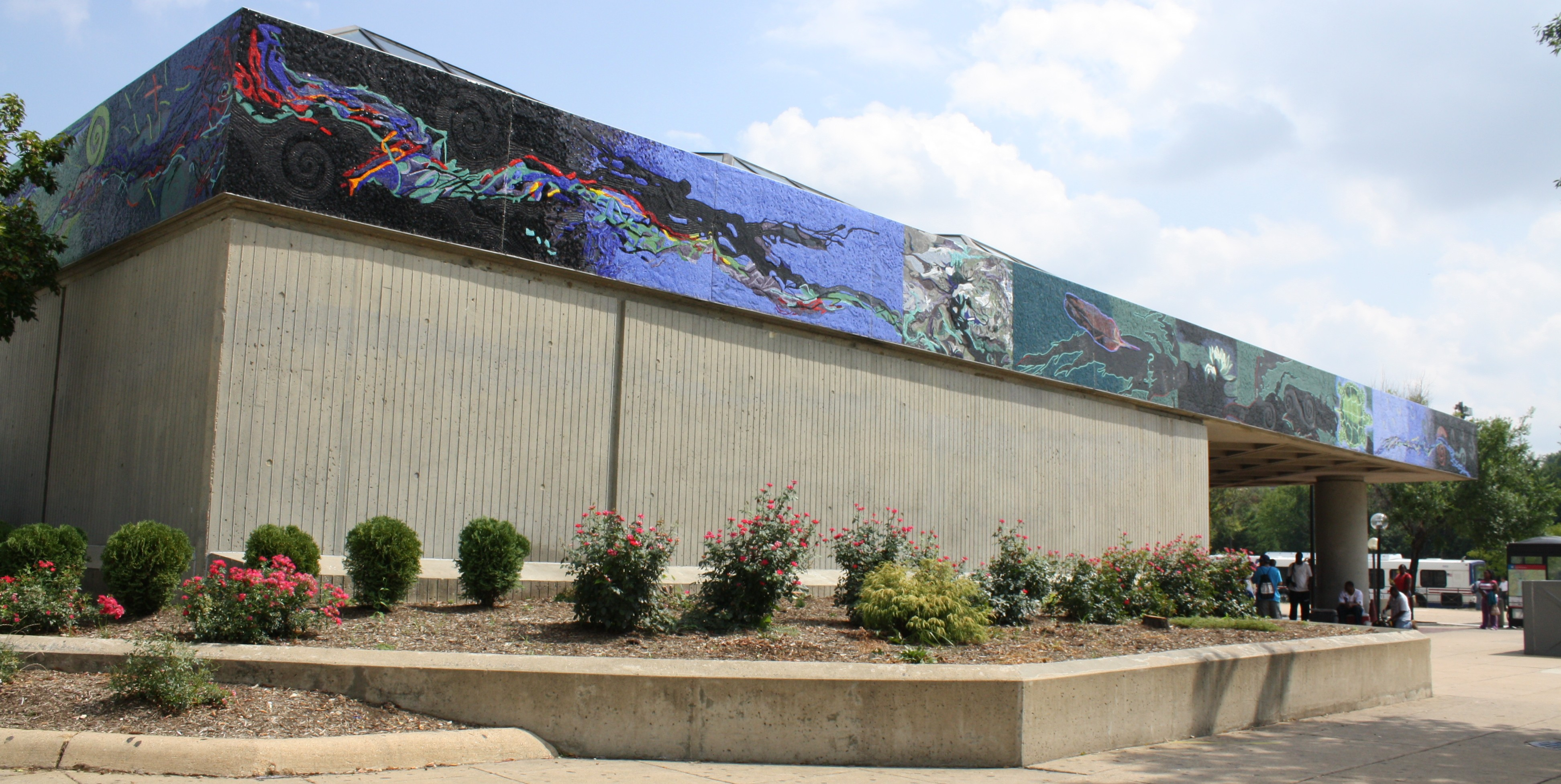
River Spirits of the Anacostia, Anacostia Metro Station, Washington, DC

Martha Jackson Jarvis was born in 1952 in Lynchburg, Virginia, and engaged with the arts from an early age. During her early childhood in the 1950s and 1960s, she lived in Virginia, an experience she describes as "very segregated". She credits her interest in art to a childhood experience of accompanying her grandmother to a local spring to gather white clay and later making dolls and other objects with the material. The family moved to Philadelphia when Jackson Jarvis was thirteen.

Jackson Jarvis pursued a formal education in fine arts. She obtained a Bachelor of Fine Arts degree from Howard University in 1974, and a Master of Fine Arts degree from the Maryland Institute College of Art in 1984. Her first year at Howard University in 1970 was influential, due to the active presence of artists including Lois Mailou Jones, Ed Love, Jeff Donaldson, and Elizabeth Catlett. Jackson Jarvis transferred to Temple University's Tyler School of Art in Philadelphia to study ceramics.

She married Bernard Jarvis, the cousin of Bebe Moore Campbell. While her children, Njena and Bernard Jr., were young, Jackson Jarvis continued her studio work.

== Career and artistic style ==
Jackson Jarvis is best known for her outdoor public installations, including a mosaic, River Spirits of the Anacostia, located at the Anacostia Metro station in Washington, D.C.; and sculptures, Music of the Spheres, at Fannie Mae Plaza in Washington, D.C., and Crossroads/Trickster I, at the North Carolina Museum of Art in Raleigh. She also worked as a designer on the set of Julie Dash's 1991 film, Daughters of the Dust.

Jackson Jarvis is well-known for Signs of the Times, a series of sculptures on a large scale that examine the history and culture of the African American community. Another significant work is the Ancestors' Bones: Free Spirits series, which consists of large-scale drawings that depict the relationship between nature and the human spirit through improvisational imprints of brush strokes and drips. This work serves as a meaningful tribute to the rich heritage of the community, and has been displayed in numerous galleries and museums worldwide, such as the Smithsonian American Art Museum, the Corcoran Gallery of Art, and the National Museum of Women in the Arts.

Jackson Jarvis's artwork can be observed in public places throughout Washington, D.C., including metro stations, courthouses, and the 11th Street Bridge Park. She produced the mosaic mural River Spirits of the Anacostia for the Anacostia metro station. She and her daughter Njena Surae Jarvis created Anacostia's Sunrise/Sunset Portals for the 11th Street Bridge Par;, the sculpture is made of aluminum steel and glass mosaic, and features 11 multi-colored arches that respond to the surroundings and replicate the color scheme of a sunrise or sunset.

"Contemporary Visual Expressions" was an exhibition at the Smithsonian's Anacostia Museum showcasing works by Jackson Jarvis, Sam Gilliam, Keith Morrison, and William T. Williams. The exhibit demonstrated the new gallery's versatility, and included an installation created by artist and art historian David Driskell, who also served as guest curator for the show. The exhibit's highlight was Jackson-Jarvis' Path of the Avatar, a pinwheel structure that adds energy to the space.

Jackson Jarvis has also been an educator and mentor. She has taught at Howard University and the Maryland Institute College of Art. Her contributions to education and mentorship have earned her recognition, such as the Distinguished Alumni Award from the Cleveland Institute of Art.

== Exhibitions ==
- 1977 - African American Historical Museum, Philadelphia, Pennsylvania
- 1979 - Brooks Memorial Museum – Memphis, TN
- 1980 - Washington Project for the Arts (WPA), Washington, DC
- 1980 - National Sculpture Conference – Baltimore, MD
- 1981 - Howard University, Gallery of Art, Washington, DC
- 1983 - Maryland Art Place – Baltimore, MD
- 1983 - Franz Bader Gallery – Washington, DC
- 1984 - California African American Museum – Los Angeles, CA
- 1984 - Georgetown Court Artist Space – Washington, DC
- 1985 - Nexus Foundation for Contemporary Art – Philadelphia, PA
- 1985 - Dade County Public Library – Miami, FL
- 1986 - Chicago Museum of Science and Industry – Chicago, IL
- 1986 - The Everson Museum – Syracuse, NY
- 1987 - Smithsonian Institution, Anacostia Museum – Washington, DC
- 1988 - Maryland Art Institute, Myerhoff Gallery – Baltimore, MD
- 1988 - University of Delaware Museum Gallery – Newark, DE
- 1989 - BR Kornblatt Gallery – Washington, DC
- 1989 - Washington Project for the Arts – Washington, DC
- 1989 - California African American Museum – Los Angeles, CA
- 1990 - New Jersey Center for Visual Arts – Summit, NJ
- 1990 - SUNY College at Brockport Tower – Brockport, NY
- 1990 - Southeastern Center for Contemporary Art (SECCA) – Winston-Salem, NC
- 1990 - Museum of Contemporary Hispanic Art – New York, NY
- 1991 - Tretyakov Gallery – Moscow
- 1991 - BR Kornblatt Gallery – Washington, DC
- 1991 - National Museum of Women in the Arts – Washington, DC
- 1992 - The Fern Bank, Museum of Natural History – Atlanta, GA
- 1992 - Peninsula Fine Arts Center – Newport News, VA
- 1993 - Studio Museum of Harlem – New York, NY
- 1993 - Philadelphia African American Historical Museum – Philadelphia, PA
- 1994 - Art Museum of the Americas, Organization of American States – Washington, DC
- 1994 - University of Maryland Art Gallery – College Park, MD
- 1995 - Snug Harbor Cultural Center – Staten Island, NY
- 1996 - Swarthmore College – Swarthmore, PA
- 1996 - Maryland Art Place – Baltimore, MD
- 1996 - "Structuring Energy" at the Corcoran Gallery – Washington, DC
- 1996 - FSU Museum of Fine Arts – Tallahassee, FL
- 1996 - African-American Museum – Dallas, TX
- 1996 - Main Line Art Center – Haverford, PA
- 1997 - Spoleto Festival USA – Charleston, SC
- 1999–2000 - Society for Contemporary Craft – Pittsburgh, PA
- 2000 - Baley Museum – Richmond/Orange, VA
- 2000 - South Carolina Botanical Garden Clemson, SC
- 2000 - Addison-Ripley Fine Art – Washington, DC
- 2007 - American University Museum – Washington, DC
- 2007 - Manchester Craftsmen's Guild – Pittsburgh, PA
- 2008 - Bactria Art Center, Dushanbe, Tajikistan
- 2008 - Galerie Myrtis – Baltimore, MD
- 2010 - The Kreeger Museum – Washington, DC
- 2010 - University of Maryland University College – Adelphi, MD
- 2010 - American University Museum – Washington, DC
- 2011 - Gateway Art Center / Prince George's African American Museum – Brentwood, MD
- 2011 - Reginald F. Lewis Museum – Baltimore, MD
- 2011 - Museum of the Americas, Organization of American States – Washington, DC
- 2013 - "Martha Jackson Jarvis: Ancestor's Bones" at the Williams Center Gallery, Lafayette College - Easton, PA
- 2018 - Dumbarton Oaks Museum, Outside/IN, Washington, DC
- 2023 - African American Museum in Philadelphia - Philadelphia, PA

== Recognition and awards ==
Jackson Jarvis has received several awards and honors for her artistic contributions, including a National Endowment for the Arts Fellowship. She was inducted into the Washington, D.C. Hall of Fame, in recognition of her impact and influence in the region.

Julie McGee, an art historian at the University of Delaware, stated, "The work of Jackson Jarvis operates in two worlds—that of large-scale public commissions and the more intimate space of the gallery. Very few artists are able to finesse both, and certainly not with her acumen and sensitivity."

- 1986 - National Endowment for the Arts Fellowship in sculpture
- 1977–1978 - Crafts Artist Grant
- 1979–1980 - Individual Artist Grant in Sculpture, DC, Commission on the Arts and Humanities
- 1982 - Emerging Artist Award, Washington, DC, Mayor's Art Award
- 1986 - Individual Artist Grant in Sculpture, DC, Commission on the Arts
- 1988 - Penny McCall Foundation Grant Award in Sculpture
- 1992 - Virginia Groot Fellowship Grant in Sculpture
- 1992 - Lila Wallace-Reader's Digest Travel Grant to Italy, The American Academy in Rome
- 1994 - Study Grant, Pilchuck Glass School
- 2000 - Creative Capital Award in visual arts
- 2007 - Artist in Residence, Lafayette College, Blackburn/Tague Experimental Printmaking Institute
- 2011 - United States Artists Project
- 2011 - Nominated for Anonymous Was a Woman Award
- Distinguished Alumni Award

== Works ==
- Gathering, 1988; University of Delaware
- Ochun: Earth Mounds, 1999-2000; South Carolina Botanical Garden, Clemson University
- Music of the Spheres, 2003; Van Ness Metro Station, Washington, DC
- Crossroads/Trickster I, 2005, Commissioned by the North Carolina Museum of Art
- Signs of the Times
- River Spirits of the Anacostia
- Anacostia's Sunrise/Sunset Portals
- Ancestors' Bones: Free Spirits

== Public art spaces (public and corporate commissions) ==
- United States Embassy (Freetown, Sierra Leone)
- New York Transit Authority (Metro NYC)
- Spoleto Festival USA (Charleston, SC)
- Arco Chemical Co. (Newton, PA)
- Cleveland Public Art (OH)
- Philip Morris Corp. (Washington, DC)
- North Carolina Museum of Art (Raleigh, NC)
- Johns Hopkins State Health Laboratory (Baltimore, MD)
- Merck Company (PA)
- Lenkin Company (Washington, DC)
- KPMG Peat Marwick (Washington, DC)
- Howery and Simon Law Firm (Washington, DC)
- RST Development (Silver Spring, MD)
- Arlington County (Arlington, VA)
- New York Percent for Art (Bronx, NY)
- Fannie Mae Corporation (Washington, DC)
- Washington Metro Transit Authority (Washington, DC)
- South Carolina Botanical Garden (Clemson, SC)
- Prince George's Co. Courthouse (Upper Marlboro, MD)
- LaGuardia Community College (Long Island, NY)
