= List of nature centers in South Carolina =

South Carolina Nature Centers (Hover mouse over pog to popup clickable link)

This is a list of nature centres and environmental education centres in the state of South Carolina.

To use the sortable tables: click on the icons at the top of each column to sort that column in alphabetical order; click again for reverse alphabetical order.

Name	Location	County	Region	Summary
Blue Heron Nature Center	Ridgeland	Jasper	Lowcountry	Facebook site, 10 acres
Cape Romain National Wildlife Refuge	Awendaw	Charleston	Charleston Metro	66,287 acres, Sewee Visitor and Environmental Education Center features displays about the various ecosystems, wildlife and heritage of the Lowcountry
Caw Caw Interpretive Center	Ravenel	Charleston	Charleston Metro	website, operated by the County, over 6 miles of trails, former rice plantation wetlands
Coastal Discovery Museum	Hilton Head Island	Beaufort	Lowcountry	website, 68 acres, art exhibits, guided nature and history walks and talks
Colleton State Park	St. George	Colleton	Lowcountry	website interpretive nature hike, fishing, swimming, birding
Edisto Beach State Park	Edisto Beach	Colleton	Lowcountry	1,255 acres, features the ACE Basin Interpretative Center
Francis Beidler Forest	Harleyville	Dorchester	Charleston Metro	National Audubon Society wildlife sanctuary in Four Holes Swamp with an environmental education center, over 16,000 acres
Harbison State Forest		Richland	Midlands	2,177 acres, features the Harbison Environmental Education Center, programs, education trails
Hatcher Garden and Woodland Preserve	Spartanburg	Spartanburg	Upstate	website Botanical garden and woodland preserve over 11 acres, open 365 days a year and run entirely by volunteers. Garden rooms and water features as well as educational trails and a running plant sale
Heron Park Nature Center	Kiawah Island	Charleston	Charleston Metro	website, part of Kiawah Island Golf Resort, located in 21-acre Night Heron Park
Hilton Pond Center for Piedmont Natural History	York	York	Olde English District	website, 11 acres, open by appointment for guided field trips only, bird banding and research center
Hobcaw Barony Discovery Center	Georgetown	Georgetown	Pee Dee	17,500 acres, access by guided tours, exhibits on pine and cypress ecosystem and the history of the 17,500 acre property
Hunting Island State Park	Beaufort	Beaufort	Lowcountry	5,000-acre barrier island, features nature center, lighthouse, 4 miles of beach
Huntington Beach State Park	Murrells Inlet	Georgetown	Pee Dee	2,500 acres, includes nature centers, Atalaya Castle historic house
Lake Conestee Nature Park	Greenville	Greenville	Upcountry	About 400 acres, managed through a partnership between the Conestee Foundation and the Greenville County Recreation District
Lee State Park	Bishopville	Lee	Pee Dee	2,839 acres, Lee Environmental Education Center features a wetland ecology lab and exhibits about the habitats and wildlife of the park
Lynches River County Park	Coward	Florence	Pee Dee	website, 676 acres, operated by the County, features Environmental Discovery Center
Magnolia Plantation and Gardens	Charleston	Charleston	Charleston Metro	70 acres, includes historic plantation house and outbuildings museum, gardens, zoo, nature center and a maze
Mobley Nature Center	Okatie	Beaufort	Lowcountry	website, part of the Spring Island 3,000-acre nature preserve and residential community, center includes a library, museum, zoo and a classroom
Myrtle Beach State Park Nature Center	Myrtle Beach	Horry	Pee Dee	312 acres
Ocean Lakes Nature Center	Myrtle Beach	Horry	Pee Dee	website, part of the Ocean Lakes Family Campground, focus on shells, fossils, sea life, wildlife and ecology of coastal South Carolina
Silver Bluff Audubon Center and Sanctuary	Jackson	Aiken	Augusta area	website, 3,154 acres, operated by the National Audubon Society
South Carolina Botanical Garden	Clemson	Pickens	Upcountry	295 acres, includes gardens, 70 acre arboretum, Hanson Nature Learning Center, Bob Campbell Geology Museum and art exhibits
Table Rock State Park	Pickens	Pickens	Upcountry	3,083 acres
Tiedemann Park Nature Center	Charleston	Charleston	Charleston Metro	website, operated by the City, focus on Low Country habitats, environments and wildlife
Waccamaw National Wildlife Refuge	Georgetown	Georgetown	Pee Dee	22,931 acres in 3 counties, visitor center and environmental education center in Georgetown
Walterboro Wildlife Sanctuary	Walterboro	Colleton	Lowcountry	website, 842-acre estuary preserve, planned Discovery Center, operated by the City
Webb Wildlife Center	Garnett	Hampton	Lowcountry	website, 5,866 acres, state-operated wildlife management area
Wild Turkey Center and Winchester Museum	Edgefield	Edgefield	Augusta area	website, operated by the National Wild Turkey Federation, museum dedicated to wild turkey restoration, management and hunting, and 100 acre outdoor education center

== Resources ==
- Environmental Education in South Carolina
