= Clemson Area African American Museum =

Clemson Area African American Museum (CAAAM)
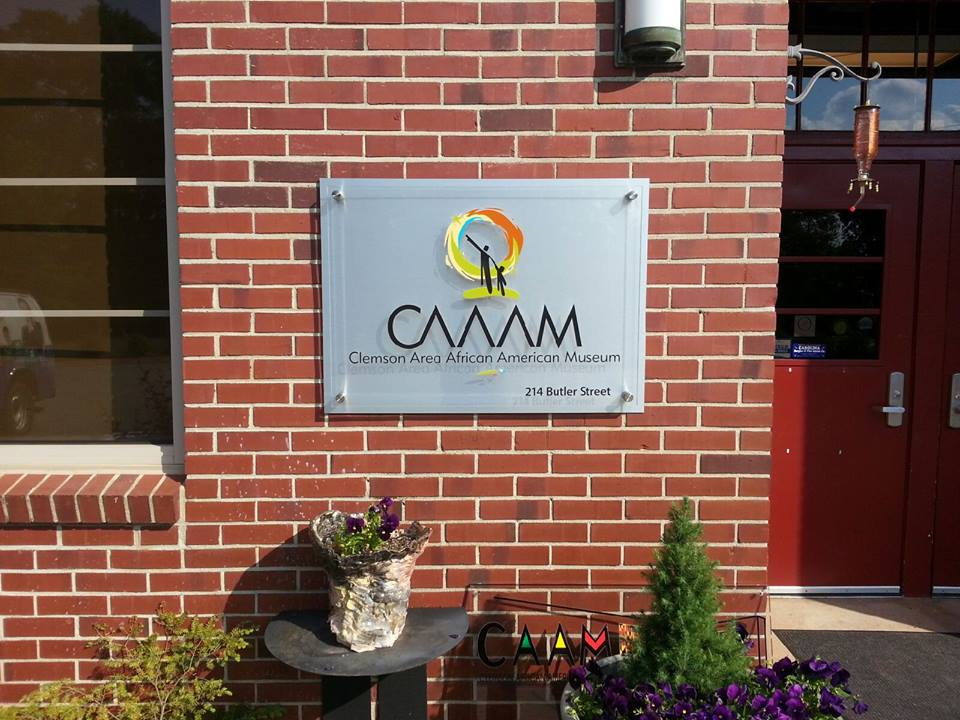

- Clemson, South Carolina
- Established: 2002
- Location: Calhoun Bridge Center, Clemson, South Carolina
- Coordinates: 34.685172°N 82.821062°W
- Type: African American museum
- Public transit access: Clemson Area Transit
- Website: www.caaam.org

The Clemson Area African American Museum (CAAAM) is a museum located in Calhoun Bridge Center, Clemson, South Carolina, United States. The Museum focuses on historical achievements and culture of African Americans.

== History ==
The Clemson Area African American Museum was chartered by the City of Clemson, South Carolina, in 2002 and first opened in 2007. The realization of the museum was brought one step closer to reality when the City of Clemson, fostered by the vision of Mayor Larry Abernathy, purchased and renovated the facility for community and cultural purposes.

The Clemson Area African American Museum is located in the Calhoun Bridge Center and the center was formerly an all-black school that was known as the Calhoun Elementary School. It was the last school built for African American students in this part of Pickens County.

== Building ==
The Clemson Area African American Museum is located in the old Morrison Annex Building.

The site of the Morrison Annex building in the Goldenview community was home to the second African American school, Calhoun Elementary, during segregation. It was preceded by a one-room school house that stood near the Goldenview Baptist Church. The current annex building was built by Pickens County School district in the 1940s to serve the needs of the growing number of African American families in the Calhoun area.

After desegregation both the name and the use of the Calhoun Elementary School building changed. In 1971, the building was converted to a kindergarten and first grade facility, with grades two through five, attending Margaret Morrison Elementary School and named Morrison Annex.

After the opening of the Clemson Elementary School at its new location, the City of Clemson acquired the Morrison Annex property in August 2003 for $100,000 from the Pickens County school district.

The building on Butler Street was refurbished at a cost of about $1.3 million, the overhaul finished in 2006.

On April 16, 2007, the City of Clemson officially the name change for the Morrison Annex to the Calhoun Bridge Center.

The Calhoun Bridge Center, not only houses the Clemson Area African American Museum, it also houses the Clemson Child Development Center and the Arts Center of Clemson.

== Collection ==
CAAAM exists to research, collect, preserve and interpret for public enrichment, the history, art and culture of African Americans. The museum conserves objects of art, historical artifacts and memorabilia other reference materials available for limited public use.

== See also ==
- List of museums focused on African Americans
- List of museums in South Carolina
- Southern Arts Federation
- National Endowment for the Arts
