= Parris Island Drydock and Commanding Generals House =

- U.S. National Register of Historic Places
- U.S. Historic district
- Location within South Carolina Location within the United States
- Location: Mexico and Tripoli Sts., Parris Island, South Carolina
- Coordinates: 32°21′0″N 80°40′18″W
- Area: 2 acres (0.81 ha)
- Built: c. 1891-1895
- Built by: U.S. Navy
- Architectural style: Late Victorian, Wooden Drydock
- NRHP reference No.: 78002492
- Added to NRHP: November 21, 1978

Parris Island Drydock and Commanding Generals House is a historic home and drydock and national historic district located at Parris Island, Beaufort County, South Carolina. The district encompasses one contributing building and two contributing structures at the Marine Corps Recruit Depot Parris Island. The drydock was constructed in the early 1890s and was one of the few wooden graving-type drydocks in the United States. It was also the largest naval drydock at the time of its construction. It fell into disrepair in the 1920s as ships began to outgrow the drydock. Quarters One, or the Commanding General's home, was constructed between 1891 and 1895, and has been the traditional home of the depot Commanding General. The two-story house has 27 rooms and features a full-width porch that also partially down both sides of the house. Associated with the home is a contributing octagonal gazebo (c. 1900).

It was listed in the National Register of Historic Places in 1978.
