= Parris Island, South Carolina =

District of the city of Port Royal, South Carolina

- District
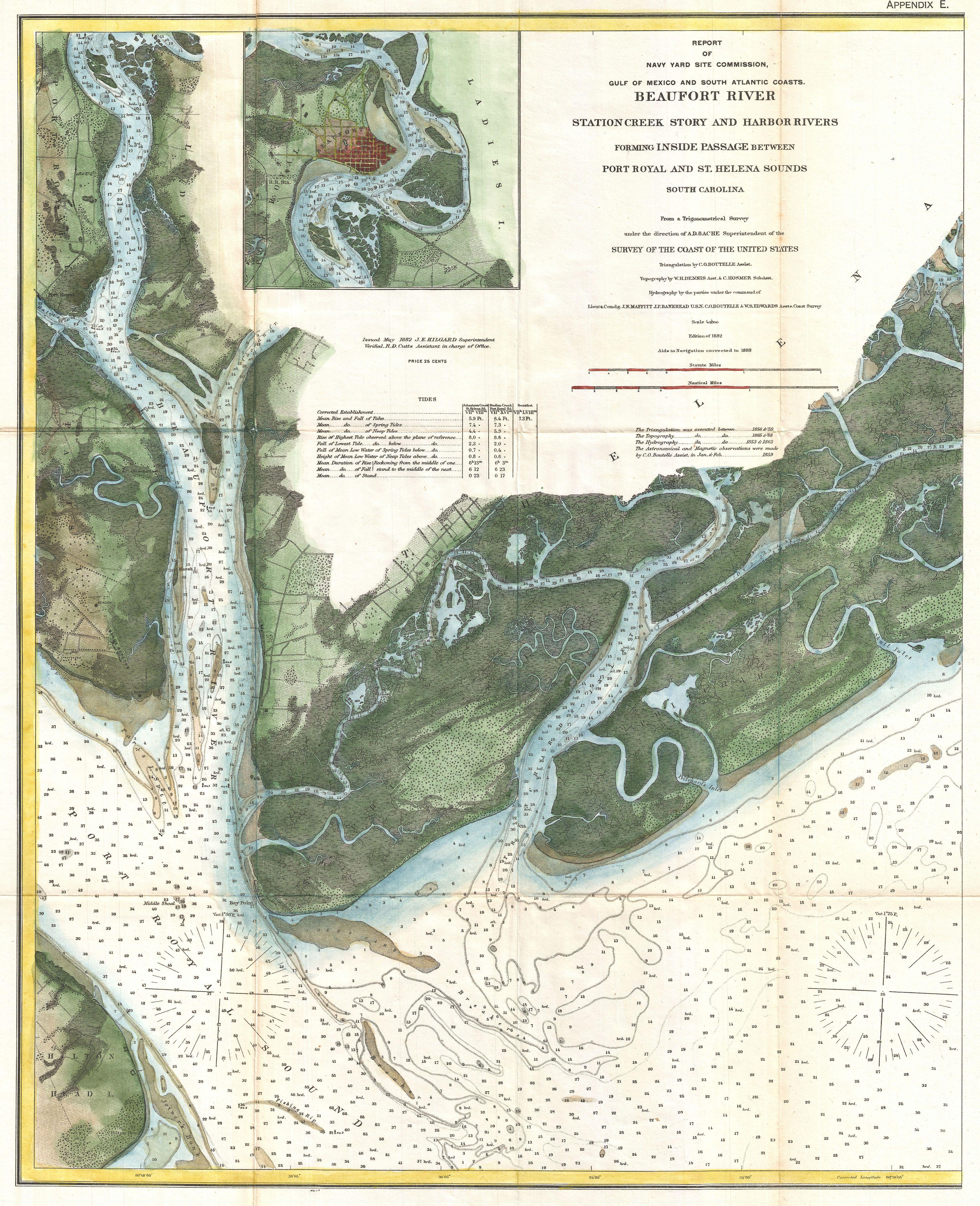
- 1882 U.S. Coast Survey Map of Beaufort River, showing the island (at left) designated "Paris I."

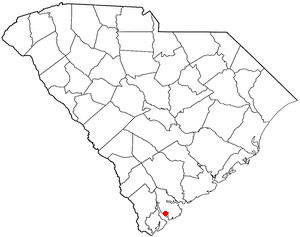
- Location of Parris Island, South Carolina
- Coordinates: 32°19′44″N 80°41′41″W
- Country: United States
- State: South Carolina
- County: Beaufort

Area
  - Total: 19.6 sq mi (51 km^{2})
  - Land: 12.2 sq mi (32 km^{2})
  - Water: 7.4 sq mi (19 km^{2})

Population (2000)
  - Total: 4,841
  - Density: 397/sq mi (153/km^{2})
- Time zone: UTC-5 (Eastern (EST))
  - Summer (DST): UTC-4 (EDT)
- ZIP codes: 29902, 29905
- Area codes: 843, 854
- FIPS code: 45-54850

Parris Island is a district of the city of Port Royal, South Carolina on an island of the same name. It became part of the city with the annexation of the Marine Corps Recruit Depot Parris Island on October 11, 2002. For statistical purposes, the United States Census Bureau previously defined Parris Island as a census-designated place (CDP) when it was an unincorporated area of Beaufort County. The population was 4,841 at the 2000 census. As defined by the U.S. Census Bureau, Parris Island is included within the Beaufort Urban Cluster and the larger Hilton Head Island–Beaufort Micropolitan Statistical Area.

== History ==
Parris Island was first colonized by Europeans in 1562, when members of a French expedition led by Jean Ribaut temporarily settled on the island. This was the first semi-permanent European settlement in what are now considered the United States. Four years later, a town named Santa Elena was founded here by Spanish Conquistador Pedro Menéndez de Avilés. It was the capital of La Florida from 1566 to 1587, during which time Spanish explorers sailed from Santa Elena to explore the Chesapeake Bay. An expedition also traveled overland into the interior to western North Carolina and points west.

After coming under English control, the island was granted to Robert Daniell in 1706 and became known as Port Royal Island. It later came into the hands of Colonel Alexander Parris, sometimes spelled "Paris," Public Treasurer of South Carolina. After his death in 1736, it gradually became known as Parris Island (and the name Port Royal Island was applied to a different one to the north).

Parris Island was captured by the Union Army in 1861 during the American Civil War. It became a coaling station during the war. After the war, through the efforts of African American Congressman Robert Smalls, it continued as a coaling station for the United States Navy and became known as the Port Royal Naval Station. The neighboring Port Royal Sound is one of the deepest natural harbors on the Atlantic coast of the United States south of New York. The island was purchased outright in 1883. In the early 1890s, a dry dock was constructed at the naval station. The dry dock was completed in 1895. The construction of the Charleston Naval Shipyard in 1901 resulted in the closing of the Port Royal Naval Station in 1903.

In 1915, Parris Island became the Marine Corps Recruit Depot. In the early years of the Marine Corps presence it was referred to as Paris Island.

The Charlesfort-Santa Elena Site and Parris Island Drydock and Commanding Generals House are listed on the National Register of Historic Places.

== Geography ==
According to the United States Census Bureau, the CDP had a total area of 19.6 square miles (51 km^{2}), of which 12.2 square miles (32 km^{2}) is land and 7.4 square miles (19 km^{2}) of it (37.96%) is water.

== Demographics ==
As of the census of 2000, there were 4,841 people, 318 households, and 297 families residing in the CDP. The population density was 398.0 inhabitants per square mile (153.7/km^{2}). There were 358 housing units at an average density of 29.4 per square mile (11.4/km^{2}). The racial makeup of the CDP was 69.14% White, 17.35% African American, 0.83% Native American, 1.76% Asian, 0.12% Pacific Islander, 7.13% from other races, and 3.68% from two or more races. Hispanic or Latino of any race were 13.16% of the population.

There were 318 households, out of which 72.3% had children under the age of 18 living with them, 87.7% were married couples living together, 4.4% had a female householder with no husband present, and 6.3% were non-families. 4.4% of all households were made up of individuals, and none had someone living alone who was 65 years of age or older. The average household size was 3.31 and the average family size was 3.40.

In the CDP, the population was spread out, with 10.6% under the age of 18, 72.4% from 18 to 24, 15.7% from 25 to 44, and 1.2% from 45 to 64. The median age was 20 years. For every 100 females, there were 303.8 males. For every 100 females age 18 and over, there were 339.3 males.

The median income for a household in the CDP was $46,335, and the median income for a family was $45,750. Males had a median income of $17,428 versus $16,359 for females. The per capita income for the CDP was $11,216. About 7.6% of families and 6.9% of the population were below the poverty line, including 4.1% of those under age 18 and none of those age 65 or over.

== In popular culture ==
Parris Island was the setting for the first third of Stanley Kubrick's 1987 war film Full Metal Jacket, as well as the scene of several flashbacks in the TV series Revolution. It is also mentioned in the opening lines of the song "Goodnight Saigon" by Billy Joel.

In 1994, Parris Island is also named in season two, episode four ("Sleepless") of The X-Files as a location of interest.

The 2025 Netflix series Boots is set at Parris Island.

== See also ==
- Marine Corps Recruit Depot Parris Island
- Parris Island Museum
- USS Parris Island (AG-72)
