= Marine Corps Recruit Depot Parris Island =

US Marine Corps base near Beaufort, South Carolina

- Parris Island, South Carolina
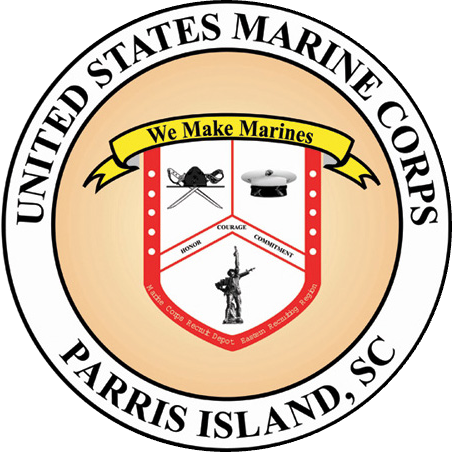

Site information
- Type: Military base
- Owner: United States
- Controlled by: United States Marine Corps
- Open to the public: No
- Website: mcrdpi.marines.mil

Site history
- Built: 1861
- In use: 1915–present

Garrison information
- Current commander: Brigadier General Ahmed T. Williamson
- Garrison: Recruit Training Regiment (1st–4th Battalions); Support Battalion; Headquarters & Service Battalion; Weapons & Field Training Battalion; 6th Marine Corps District
- Parris Island Drydock and Commanding Generals House
- U.S. National Register of Historic Places
- Location within South Carolina
- Coordinates: 32°20′21.7″N 80°41′23.8″W
- Area: 2 acres (0.81 ha)
- NRHP reference No.: 78002492
- Added to NRHP: November 21, 1978

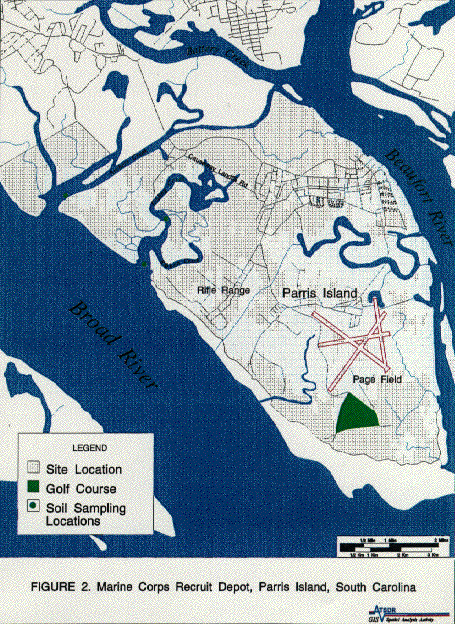
Map of Parris Island

Marine Corps Recruit Depot Parris Island (often abbreviated as MCRD PI) is an 8,095-acre (3,276 ha) military installation located within Port Royal, South Carolina, approximately 5 miles (8.0 km) south of Beaufort, the community that is typically associated with the installation. MCRD Parris Island is used for United States Marine Corps Recruit Training of enlisted United States Marines. Recruits living east of the Mississippi River report there to receive initial training. Recruits living west of the Mississippi River receive training at Marine Corps Recruit Depot San Diego, California, but may train at MCRD Parris Island by special request. Parris Island is only open to civilians for the Museum, and prior criminal history such as felonies and drug charges will prevent visitors from entering the island.

== Initial settlements ==
A French Huguenot expedition, led by Jean Ribault in 1562, was the first European group to attempt to colonize Parris Island. Earlier Spanish expeditions had sighted the area and named it "Punta de Santa Elena", which now remains one of the oldest continuously used European place names in the United States. The French expedition built an outpost named Charlesfort, and Ribault left a small garrison as he returned to France for colonists and supplies.

After a long absence because of Ribault's delay from wars in Europe, Charlesfort was abandoned after the garrison mutinied, built a ship on the island and sailed back to France in April 1563. In 1566, the Spanish, led by Pedro Menéndez de Avilés, founded a settlement named Santa Elena which became the capital of La Florida for the next decade.

Around seven distinct documented tribes already inhabited the area at the time of the French and Spanish arrival, however. The largest, the Escamacu, retaliated against the Spanish colonization of Parris Island in 1576, leading to a several year period referred to as the Escamacu War. Spanish forces retaliated and enslaved many members of the Escamacu tribe, and eventually due to continued aggressions many tribe members moved north and west.

In May 1586, English forces under Francis Drake carried out a raid on St. Augustine further south. Fearing another raid, both Santa Elena and Parris Island were abandoned by the Spanish the following year.

After coming under English control, the island was granted to Robert Daniell in 1706 and became known as Port Royal Island. It later came into the hands of Colonel Alexander Parris, the Public Treasurer of South Carolina. After his death 1736, it gradually became known as Parris Island (and the name Port Royal Island was applied to a different island to the north).

From the 1720s to the Civil War, the island was divided into several plantations, initially growing indigo then later cotton. During and after the Civil War, the island became home to freed slaves and was a site of freedmen schools taught by abolitionists such as Frances Gage and Clara Barton. Union forces captured Port Royal Sound in 1861, and Parris Island became a coaling station for the Navy. This function was taken up again after the war in large part because of the freedman-turned-Representative Robert Smalls, who fought for the creation of a federal military installation on the island.

== Military use ==
Marines were first assigned to Parris Island on 26 June 1891, in the form of a small security detachment headed by First Sergeant Richard Donovan, two corporals and 10 privates. This unit was attached to the Naval Station, Port Royal, South Carolina, the forerunner of Parris Island. Donovan's unit was highly commended for preserving life and property during hurricanes and storm surges that swept over the island in 1891 and 1893.

Military buildings and family quarters constructed between 1891 and World War I form the nucleus of the Parris Island Historic District. At the district center are the commanding general's home, a 19th-century wooden dry dock, and an early 20th-century gazebo, all of which are on the National Register of Historic Places.

On November 1, 1915, Parris Island was officially designated a Recruit Depot, and United States Marine Corps Recruit Training has continued there since then. In the early years of the Marine Corps presence it was referred to as Paris Island.

Prior to 1929, a ferry provided all transportation to and from the island from Port Royal docks to the Recruit Depot docks. That year, a causeway and a bridge over Archer's Creek were completed. The causeway was dedicated as the General E. A. Pollock Memorial Causeway in April 1984.

In the month following the Japanese attack on Pearl Harbor, 5,272 recruits arrived there with 9,206 arriving in January 1942, making it necessary to add the 5th, 6th, 7th and 8th Recruit Training Battalions. As the war influx continued, five battalions were sent to New River, North Carolina, to train, and the Depot expanded to 13 battalions. From 1941 to 1945, the Marines trained 204,509 recruits there, and at the time of the Japanese surrender, the Depot contained more than 20,000 recruits.

On February 15, 1949, the Marines activated a separate "command" for the sole purpose of training female recruits. Later, the command was designated the 4th Recruit Training Battalion.

Throughout the duration of the Korean war, around 138,000 recruits were trained on Parris Island. Compared to the 2,350 recruits in training when the war started in 1950, the highest training load hit 24,424 recruits in March of 1952. A separate peak of 10,979 recruits was also recorded in March of 1966 during the Vietnam war. Compared to these numbers, roughly 19,000 recruits are now trained on Parris Island each year.

On the night of 8 April 1956, the Ribbon Creek incident resulted in the drowning of six recruits, which led to widespread changes in recruit training policies. Supervision of drill instructors was expanded, such as the introduction of the series commander.

On 11 October 2002, the town of Port Royal annexed the entire island, but most visitors still associate the installation with Beaufort, a larger community five miles to the north.

On 17 June 2011, Brigadier General Lori Reynolds became the first female commander of the base. On 20 June 2014, Brigadier General Terry Williams became the first African-American commander of the base.

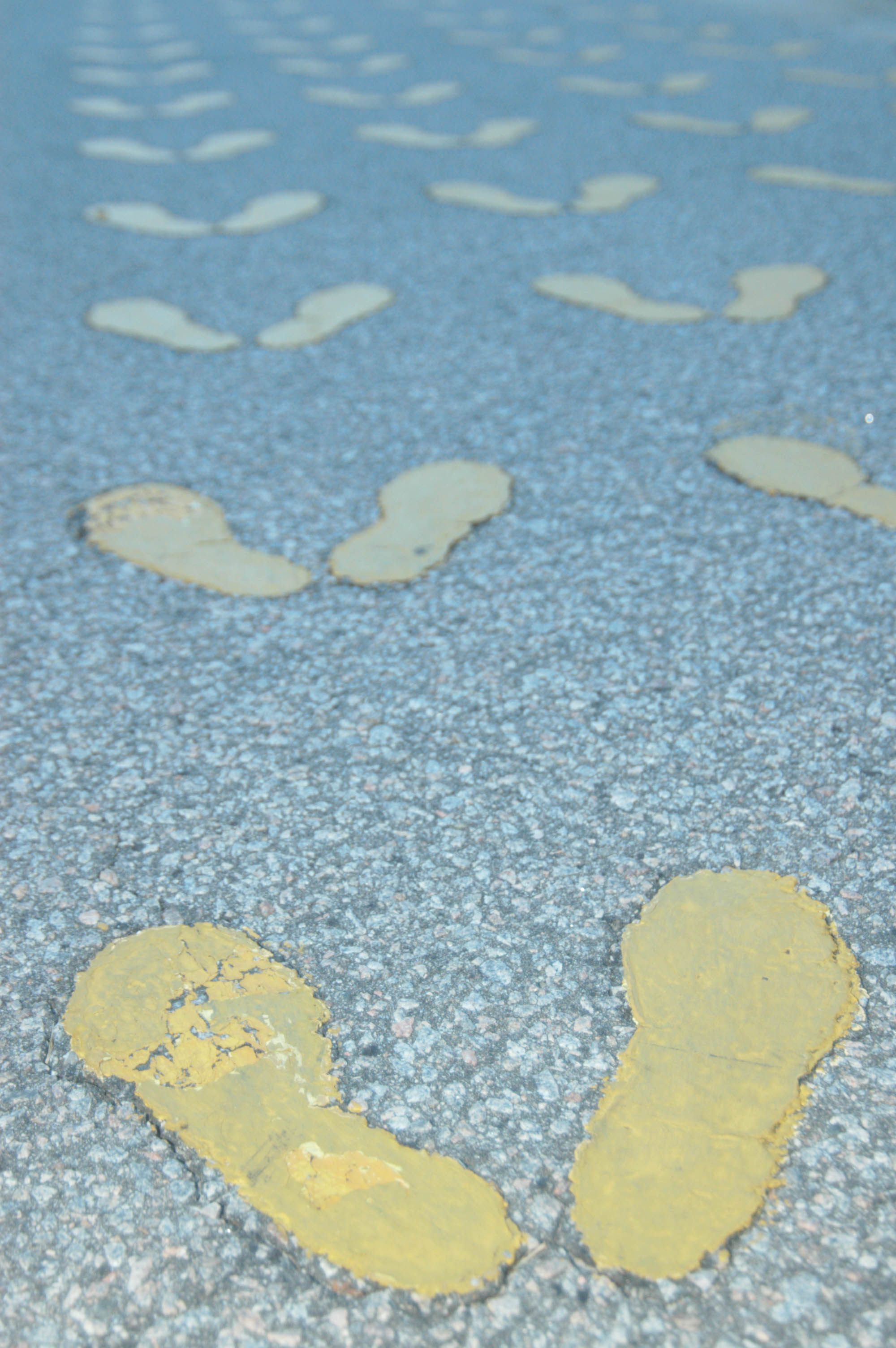
Yellow footprints outside of the Receiving Building, where prospective Marines receive their first taste of military life

An SDI welcoming recruits to MCRD in 2017

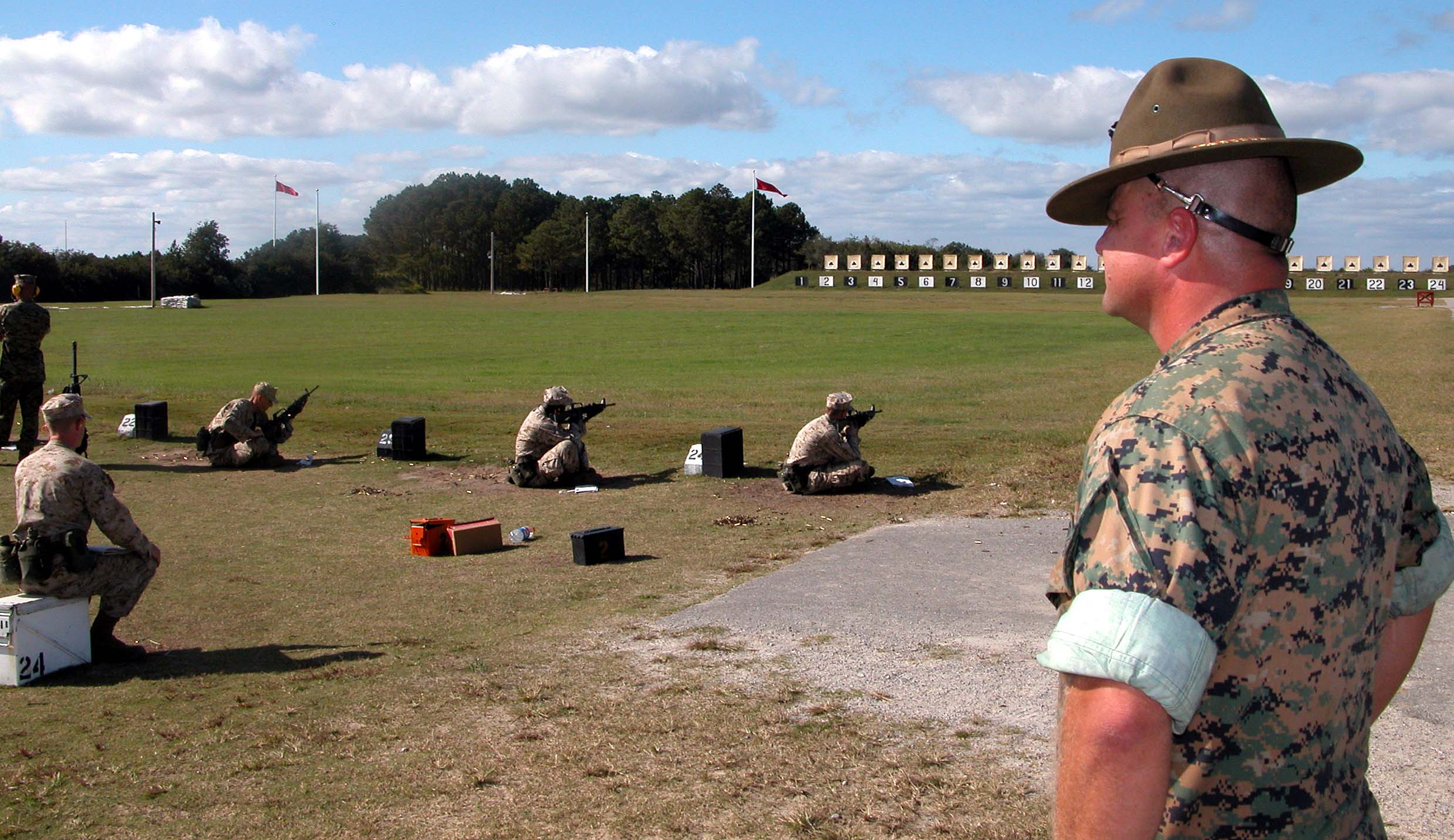
Marine recruits learning basic marksmanship on the Chosin Range

== Recruit training ==
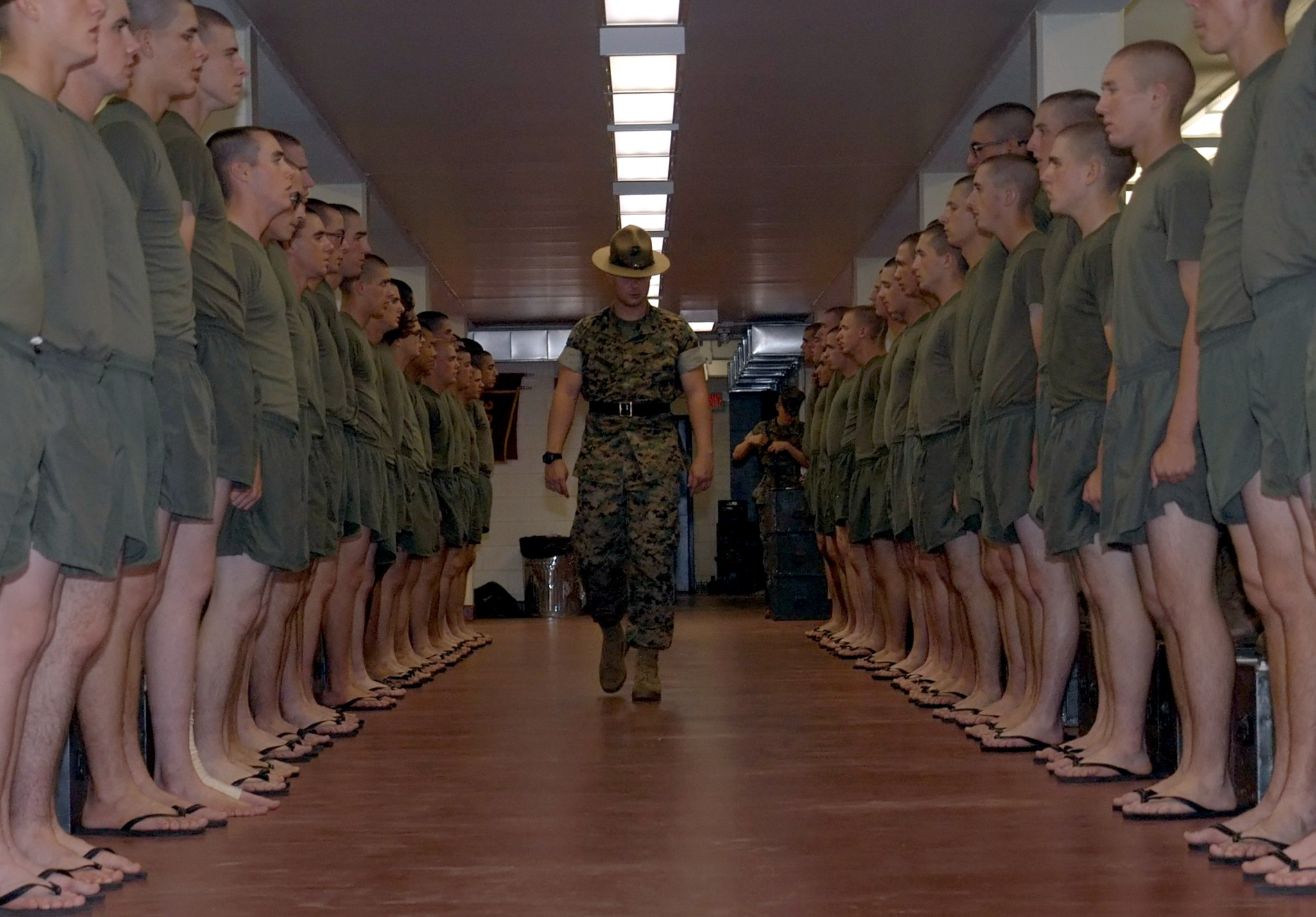
A senior drill instructor inspects his platoon shortly before lights out.

The Marines train about 17,000 recruits at Parris Island each year. Recruit training for those enlisted in the United States Marine Corps includes a thirteen-week process during which the recruit becomes cut off from the civilian world and must adapt to a Marine Corps lifestyle. During training, the drill instructors train recruits in a wide variety of subjects including weapons training, Marine Corps Martial Arts Program, personal hygiene and cleanliness, close order drill, and Marine Corps history. The training emphasizes physical fitness and combat effectiveness. Recruits must attain a minimum standard of fitness to graduate. This standard includes a Physical Fitness Test and a Combat Fitness Test. Recruits must also meet minimum combat-oriented swimming qualifications, qualify in rifle marksmanship with the M16A4 service rifle, pass minimum curriculum standards, and complete a 54-hour simulated combat exercise known as "The Crucible".

The facility has trained female U.S. Marine recruits since 1949. The facility also has female drill instructors.

== In popular culture ==
=== Film ===
- Parris Island is depicted in the film The D.I. (1957), directed by and starring Jack Webb.
- Parris Island is depicted most famously in Stanley Kubrick's movie Full Metal Jacket (1987), featuring R. Lee Ermey as Gunnery Sergeant Hartman, a memorable drill instructor ("DI"). Ermey was formerly a Marine DI at San Diego and served as technical consultant on building the film set.

=== Television ===
- Parris Island appears in and is referenced several times in the G.I. Joe franchise. Professional wrestler/G.I. Joe character Sgt. Slaughter (portrayed by/voiced by Bob Remus) was billed from/born in Parris Island, South Carolina and was known as the "toughest drill instructor" to come out of MCRD. G.I. Joe character Gung-Ho graduated from Parris Island; another character, Leatherneck, served as a drill instructor there. Parris Island appears in the episode "The Rotten Egg" of the original G.I. Joe cartoon.
- The JAG episode titled "Boot" was set at MCRD.
- Parris Island is the setting of several flashbacks in the TV series Revolution.
- The 2025 Netflix series Boots depicts boot camp on Parris Island.

=== Music ===
- Billy Joel's song "Goodnight Saigon" mentions the U.S. Marine Corps training base multiple times ("We met as soulmates on Parris Island").

== See also ==
- Parris Island Museum
- USS Parris Island (AG-72)
