= Parris Island Museum =

Museum in South Carolina, United States

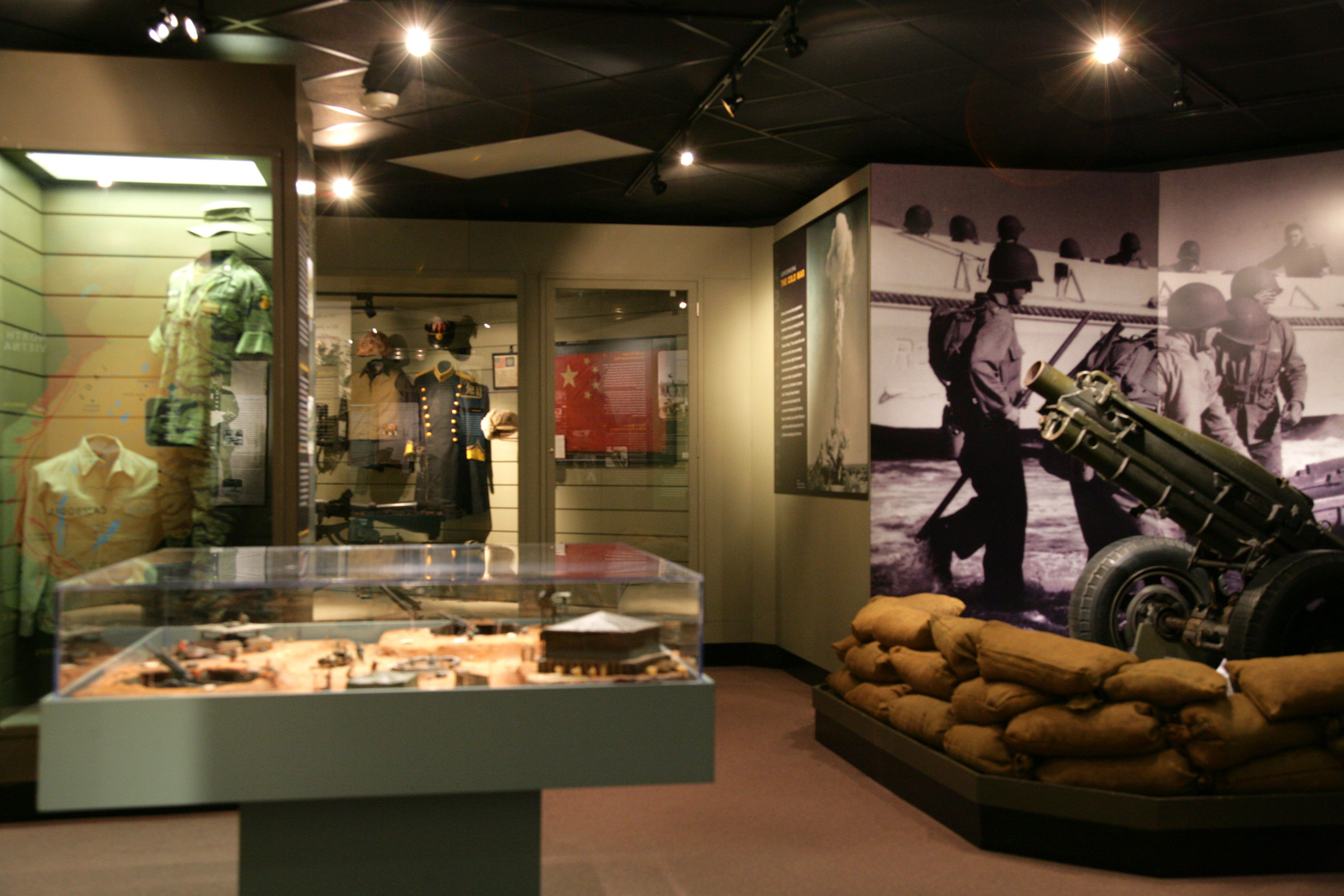

- Location within South Carolina
- Established: January 8, 1975
- Location: Building 111, Panama Street; Marine Corps Recruit Depot; Beaufort, South Carolina; United States
- Coordinates: 32°20′50.9562″N 80°40′38.5″W
- Type: Military History

The Parris Island Museum is located at Building 111, Panama Street, Marine Corps Recruit Depot Parris Island in Beaufort, South Carolina, United States. The museum consists of a 10,000-square-foot (930 m^{2}) facility and includes exhibits of the history of the United States Marine Corps as well as the history of the Port Royal region. Exhibits cover the span of time and occupancy of the island, from Native American civilization and French and Spanish colonies to modern day. Other exhibits display artifacts from the early 19th century to the present day.

== History ==
Commandant of the Marine Corps General Robert E. Cushman, Jr. dedicated the museum on January 8, 1975, in the former War Memorial Building, originally constructed in 1951 as an enlisted recreation center. A year-long renovation of the museum was completed in the spring of 2008.

== See also ==
- United States Marine Corps Recruit Training
- USS Parris Island (AG-72)
