= Heyward-Washington House =

Historic house in South Carolina, United States

- U.S. National Register of Historic Places
- U.S. National Historic Landmark
- U.S. National Historic Landmark District – Contributing property
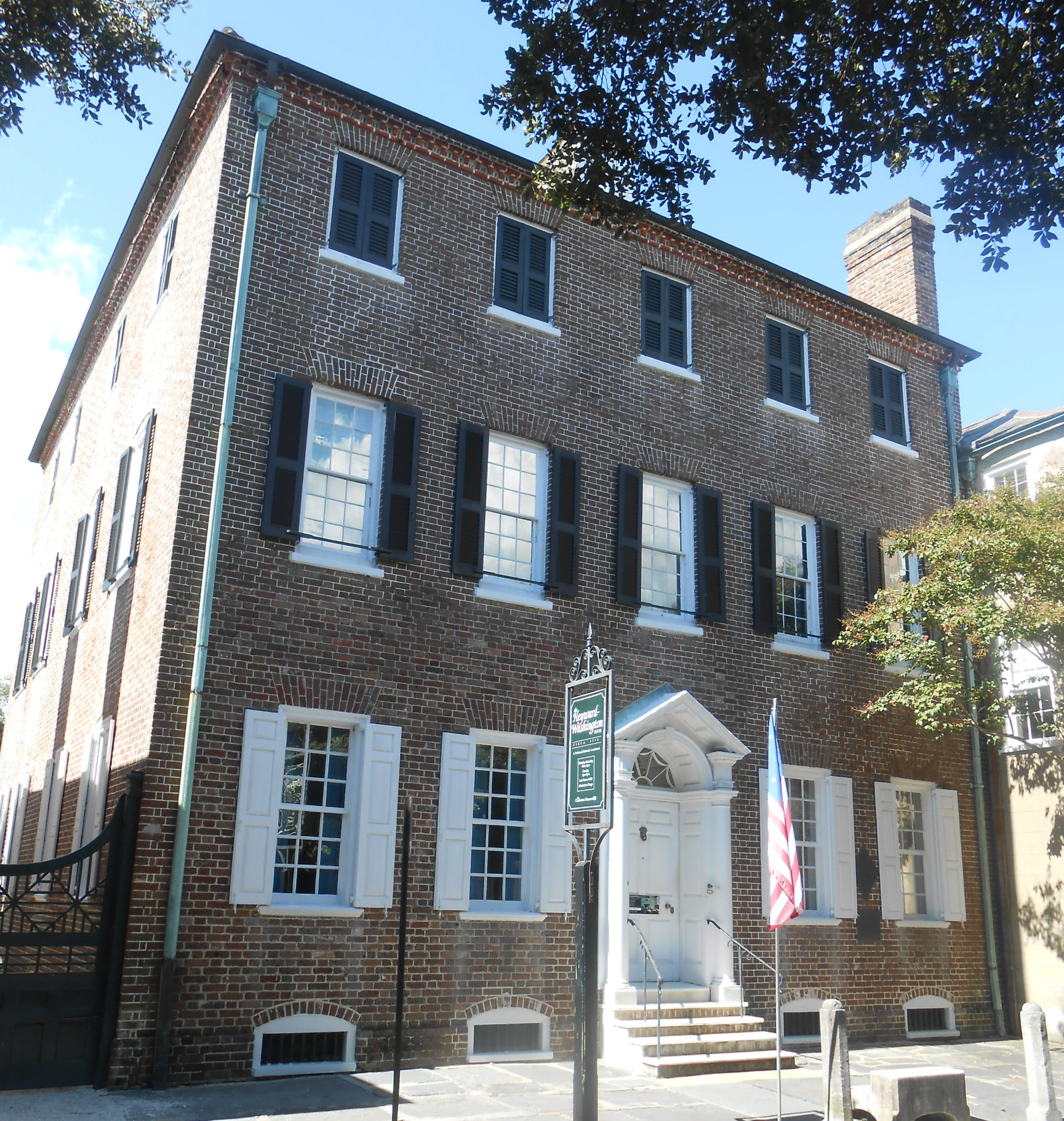
- Heyward-Washington House

- Location within South Carolina Location within the United States
- Location: 87 Church St., Charleston, South Carolina
- Coordinates: 32°46′32.57″N 79°55′46.14″W
- Built: 1772
- Part of: Charleston Historic District (ID66000964)
- NRHP reference No.: 70000576

Significant dates
- Added to NRHP: April 15, 1970
- Designated NHL: April 15, 1970
- Designated NHLDCP: October 9, 1960

The Heyward-Washington House is a historic house museum at 87 Church Street in Charleston, South Carolina. Built in 1772, it was home to Thomas Heyward, Jr., a signer of the United States Declaration of Independence, and was where George Washington stayed during his 1791 visit to the city. It is now owned and operated by the Charleston Museum. Furnished for the late 18th century, the house includes a collection of Charleston-made furniture. Other structures include the carriage shed and 1740s kitchen building.

The house was declared a National Historic Landmark in 1970.

== History ==
Built in 1772, this Georgian-style double house was the town home of Founding Father Thomas Heyward, Jr., one of four South Carolina signers of the Declaration of Independence. A patriot leader and artillery officer with the South Carolina militia during the American Revolutionary War, Heyward was captured when the British took Charleston in 1780. He was exiled to St. Augustine, Florida, but was exchanged in 1781.

The City rented this house for George Washington's use during the President's week-long Charleston stay, in May 1791, and it has traditionally been called the "Heyward-Washington House." Heyward sold the house in 1794 to John F. Grimké, also a Revolutionary War officer and father of Sarah and Angeline Grimke, the famous abolitionists and suffragettes.

In 1824, it was purchased by Mrs. Margaret Munro, who operated a boarding house. Margaret Munro left the house to her granddaughter, Elizabeth Jane Hervey, who married Tobias Cambridge Trott in 1857. The couple resided at 87 Church Street after their marriage. Tobias Trott died unexpectedly in 1863, and with the Union bombardment of Charleston at the onset of the Civil War, Elizabeth fled to the upstate with her three young children. After the city fell, Union soldiers were billeted at 87 Church Street.

A bronze marker was unveiled on May 23, 1901, reciting the history of George Washington's stay at the house in May 1791.

The property was acquired by the museum in 1929, opened the following year as Charleston's first historic house museum, and was recognized as a National Historic Landmark in 1978.

The museum features a collection of historic Charleston-made furniture including the priceless Holmes Bookcase, considered one of the finest examples of American-made colonial furniture. The property also features the only 1740s kitchen building open to the public in Charleston as well as formal gardens featuring plants commonly used in the South Carolina Lowcountry in the late 18th century.

== See also ==
- Edmondston-Alston House
- List of National Historic Landmarks in South Carolina
- National Register of Historic Places listings in Charleston, South Carolina
