= Hatcher Garden and Woodland Preserve =

Public garden in South Carolina

Coordinates: 34°55′53″N 81°57′27″W

Hatcher Garden and Woodland Preserve is a 10-acre (40,000 m^{2}) public garden located at 820 John B. White Sr. Blvd. in Spartanburg, South Carolina. Admission is free and the garden is open to the public during daylight hours.

== Conifer Garden ==
The Conifer Garden displays over 200 species of conifers including both trees and shrubs. The collection includes pines, spruces, firs, larches, yews, junipers, cedars, cypresses, and sequoias as well as some deciduous conifers such as the Bald Cypress.

== History ==
In 1969, Harold and Josephine Hatcher retired to Spartanburg, South Carolina and began developing the land behind their home on Briarwood Road. Over the next thirty years they acquired property totaling 10 acres (40,000 m^{2}). Much of the land was in ruin: erosion from the former cotton fields had robbed the soil of its nutrients. Trash and weeds covered the ground.

The Hatchers began working and amending the soil. They filled in the eroded lands, built paths and ponds, and planted thousands of trees, shrubs and flowers.

The Hatchers were not wealthy landowners. Limited in resources, but not in creative vision, they raised money for their projects by buying and self-renovating adjacent properties for rental income. They chose to give the Garden to the Spartanburg County Foundation which leaves the garden to the Spartanburg community in perpetuity.

== Photos ==
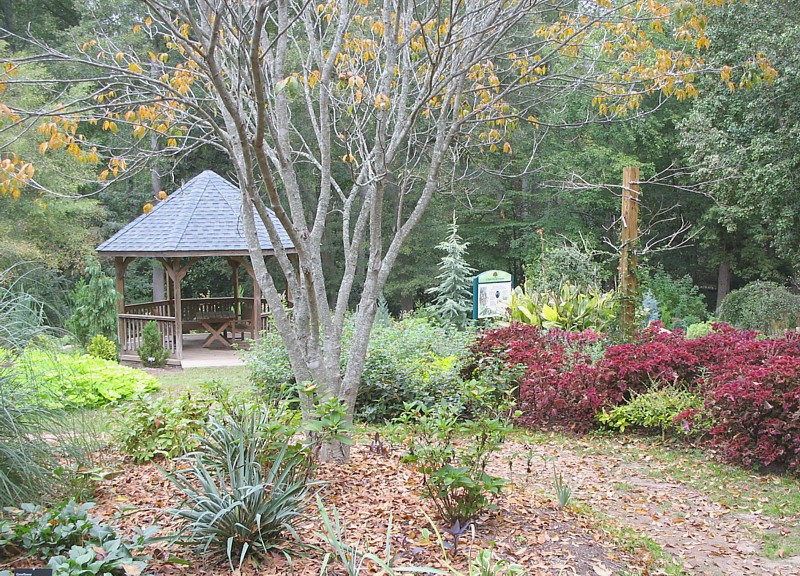

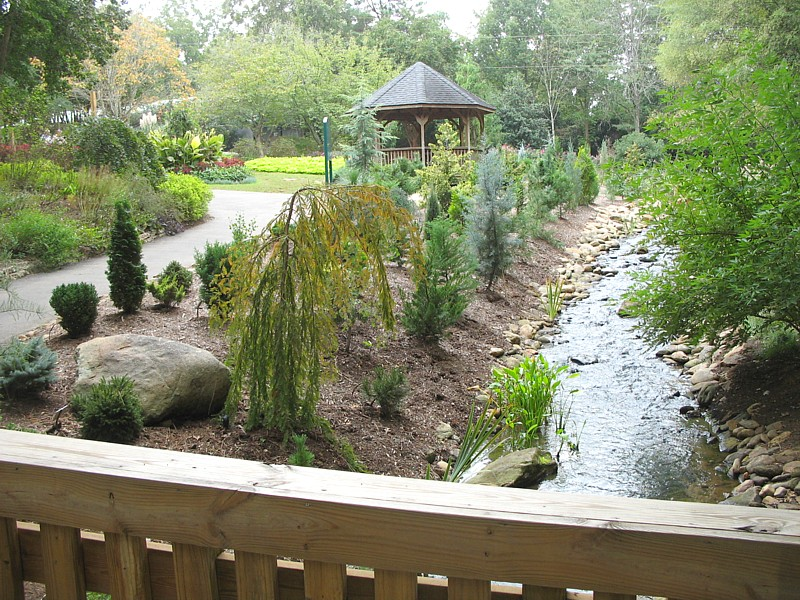
