= Price's Post Office =

Historic house/post office in the US

- U.S. National Register of Historic Places
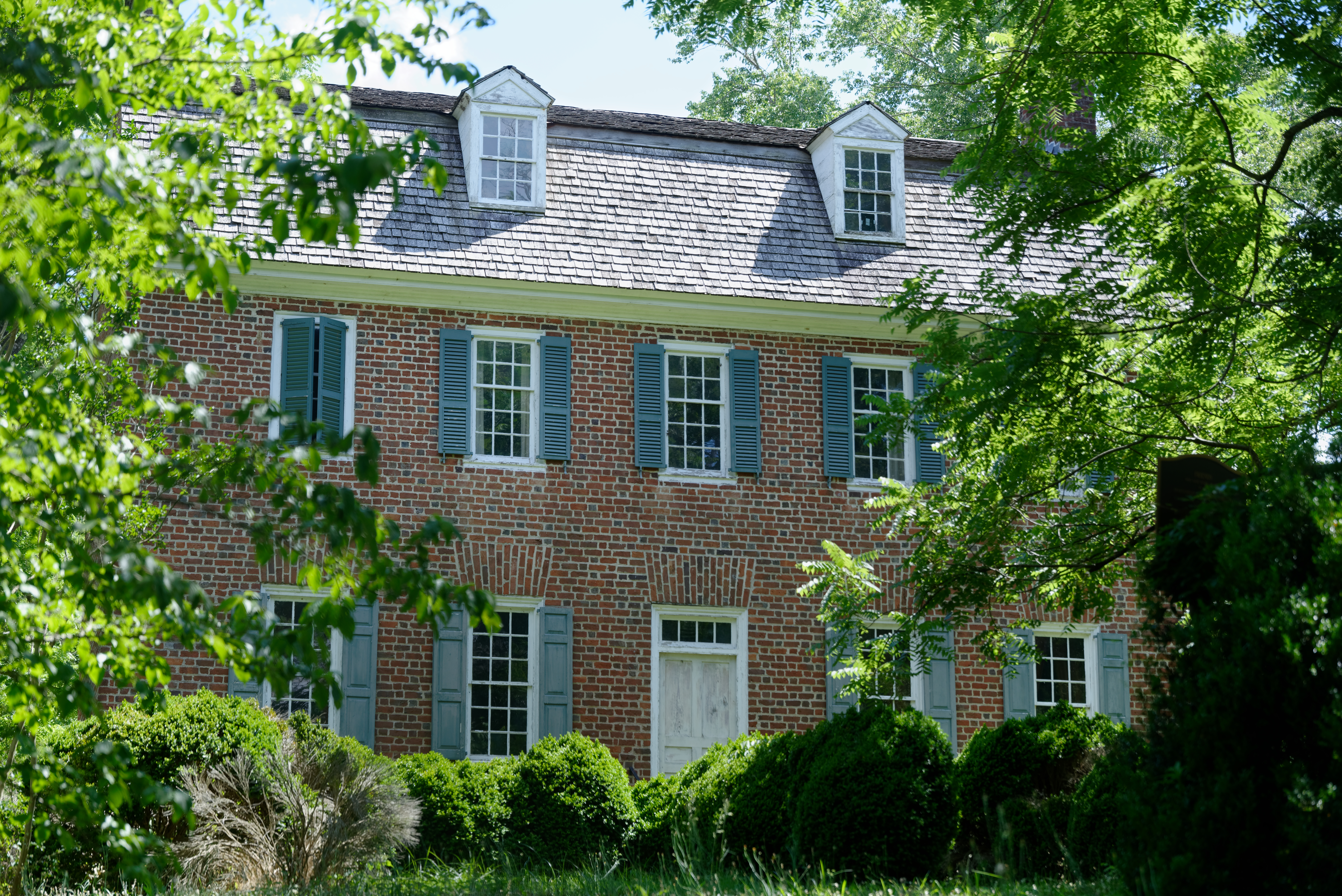
- Price House in 2021

- Location within South Carolina Location within the United States
- Location: 1200 Oak View Farm Road; Woodruff, South Carolina
- Nearest city: Woodruff, South Carolina
- Coordinates: 34°46′33″N 81°58′12″W
- Built: ca. 1800
- NRHP reference No.: 69000174
- Added to NRHP: October 28, 1969

Price's Post Office or the Price House is a house built c. 1800 in Spartanburg County, South Carolina. Its name in the USGS Geographic Names Information System is Prices Post Office. It is located at the intersection of Oak View Farm Road (South Carolina State Highway 42–200), Old Switzer Road (South Carolina State Highway 42–199), and Price House Road (South Carolina State Highway 42–86). It was named to the National Register of Historic Places on October 28, 1969.

== History ==
Thomas Price moved to the Spartanburg District around 1793. He was a landowner and entrepreneur. He operated a general store and post office next to his house. The post office was operated from about 1811 to 1820. He farmed about 2,000 acres (810 ha). The house was on the Spartanburg stagecoach line to Cross Anchor, South Carolina. He operated a "publick house" or tavern and stagecoach stop.

When his wife, Anne, died in 1821, she left a forty-two page inventory of the estate. In addition to the house furnishings, the inventory included 25 slaves and agricultural machinery. Going beyond "frontier-level," the furnishings included a curtained four poster bed, an 8-day clock, a desk, and a bookcase, and volumes of the Spectator, the Tatler and other publications. The farm equipment included grindstones, a loom, a spinning wheel, a cotton picking machine, and riding chaise.

Just after the Civil War, the house came into the hands of Captain George Bobo Dean and, according to Landrum's History of Spartanburg County it was his primary residence until he was elected Sheriff of Spartanburg and moved into town. In the Will of George B. Dean, the house (called "My Prince Place") was given to his eldest son, James Madison Dean. It remained in the Dean family until about 1936 when it was bought by the Spartanburg County Historical Association.

It is a now historic house museum operated by the Spartanburg County Historical Association. It is open on Sunday afternoons throughout the year, on Saturdays in the summer, and by reservations.

== Architecture ==
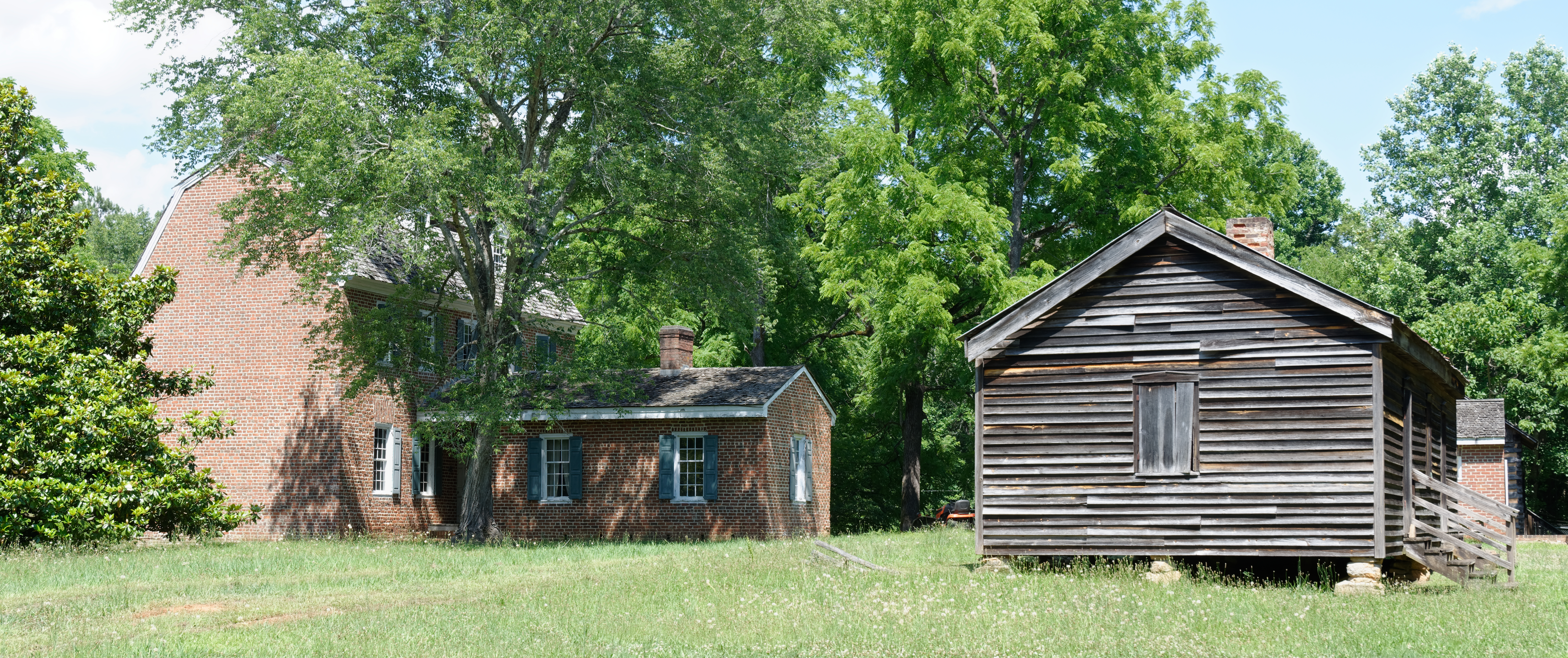
Rear of the house (with extension) and wooden building

The house is a 2 1/2-story, brick house with a gambrel roof. At that time, a gambrel roof was unusual in upstate South Carolina. The 18 in (46 cm) thick brickwork on the house is Flemish bond with darkened headers.

The rooms are paneled with wood on the walls and ceilings. The first floor has a parlor, called the Pine Room because of its wood paneling, and a large dining room for both the family and stagecoach riders. These two rooms are separated by a central hallway that extends through each story. The second floor has one small and two large bedrooms. The top floor under the eaves has one bedroom for male travelers and one for female travelers.

An extension was built to the rear around 1820. The extension was probably built as quarters for the servants. It is constructed of English bond, and is now a kitchen.
