= Black Creek Arts Council =

Coordinates: 34.37509°N 80.07469°W

Black Creek Arts Council (BCAC) is an arts-based, non-profit organization in Darlington County, South Carolina. Its offices are housed in a 10,000-square-foot (930 m^{2}) facility located at 116 West College Avenue in Hartsville, South Carolina.

BCAC offers a variety of arts programs, including arts education classes for adults and children, after-school and pre-school aged programs, summer camps and private music lessons. The Jean & James Fort Gallery hosts changing exhibits of regional and national artists.

The organization also awards sub-grants to arts-presenting non-profit organizations and individual artists in Darlington County.

== Events ==
BCAC holds Artist Crawls in Darlington and Hartsville. Area artists set up displays in businesses, homes and studios. Many artists chose to demonstrate during the Crawls and nearly all artwork is for sale. Crawl participants purchase maps to the locations and travel around enjoying refreshments at each stop.

BCAC and the Friends of the Hartsville Memorial Library work together each year to offer a community photography contest and exhibition. Photographers who live, work, or create in Darlington County can enter the contest. Winners and People's Choice Awards are given out in a variety of categories. On the opening night of the exhibition, a gallery crawl is held between the Black Creek Arts Center and the Hartsville Memorial Library.
