= USS Parris Island =

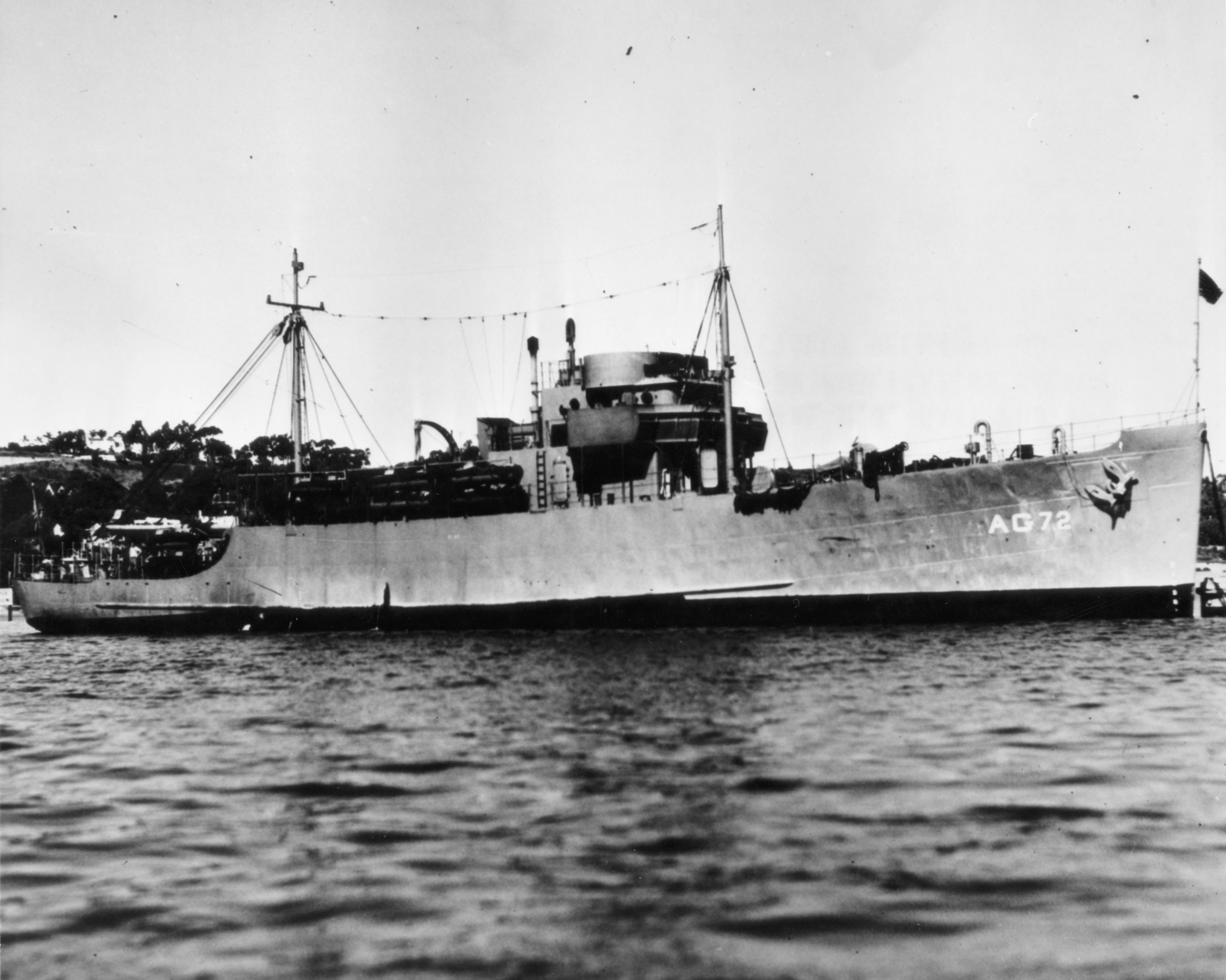
- USS Parris Island

History

United States
- Name: Parris Island
- Namesake: Parris Island
- Builder: Willamette Iron and Steel Works, Portland, Oregon
- Laid down: 10 May 1943
- Launched: 8 July 1943
- Commissioned: 30 October 1944
- Decommissioned: 19 June 1947
- Stricken: 1 August 1947
- Fate: Sold, 1948, foundered 1989, scrapped in situ 1996

General characteristics
- Type: PCE-842-class patrol craft
- Displacement: 850 long tons (864 t)
- Length: 184 ft 6 in (56.24 m)
- Beam: 33 ft (10 m)
- Draft: 9 ft (2.7 m)
- Propulsion: 2 × 1,800 hp (1,342 kW) General Motors 12-278A diesel engines; Falk single reduction gear; 2 shafts
- Speed: 15.7 knots (29.1 km/h; 18.1 mph)
- Complement: 110 officers and enlisted
- Armament: 4 × single 20 mm gun mounts

USS Parris Island (AG-72) was a patrol craft escort named for Parris Island, South Carolina (part of the Sea Islands chain, and home to Marine Corps Recruit Depot Parris Island since 1915).

Originally built as PCE–901, she was laid down on 10 May 1943 by the Willamette Iron and Steel Corporation of Portland, Oregon; launched on 8 July 1943; reclassified USS Parris Island (AG–72) on 28 April 1944; and placed in service on 30 October 1944.

== Service history ==
Parris Island was assigned to the Commandant 13th Naval District on 14 November 1944, upon completion of shakedown trials, and was transferred to the 11th Naval District on 26 November. She performed coastal duties until she was placed out of service on 19 June 1947. She was struck from the Naval Vessel Register on 1 August 1947 and turned over to the Maritime Commission on 20 January 1948 at San Diego.

In 1948, Parris Island was sold to Honduran registry. She retained her original name, serving as M/V Parris Island, and continued in this capacity into 1970. She foundered on 8 August 1989 and was scrapped in situ in 1996.
