= Greenwood Railroad Historical Center =

Coordinates: 34.1919°N 82.1613°W

The Museum & Railroad Historical Center of Greenwood is located in Greenwood, South Carolina. It offers a collection and interpretation of the history of the Lakelands region of South Carolina, especially Greenwood County.

The Museum was established in 1967 by James West Durst with the help of Bill Pittendreigh and Congressman William Jennings Bryan Dorn, and other community volunteers. The Museum opened to the public in 1970 with one room of displays in an old armory building on Phoenix Street.

The museum moved in 1982 to the current facility at 106 Main Street, next to the Greenwood Theatre and former Federal Post Office.

In 2000 the Railroad Historical Center donated its equipment and railway memorabilia to The Museum, creating the Museum and Railroad Historical Center. In 2015 the Museum received state funding to restore the locomotive and 5 passenger cars and a caboose. 3 of those items are from Greenwood's own "Piedmont & Northern Railway", of 4 surviving in the country. The P&N was an electric railway started by Southern Electric Co (Duke Power/Energy now) and moved passengers with interurbans (like the museum's 2102) between Greenwood & Spartanburg as well as an unconnected segment between Charlotte and Gastonia. The plan was to connect the lines by the Southern Railway (U.S.) used its power to block the connection, requiring freight travelling between the 2 segments to pass over Southern rails. The railroad center is open for tours for $5.00 on Saturdays May–September, or by appointment in advance, and tour guides take visitors through a 1906 steam engine, 1914 interurban, 1937 "American Flyer" coach, 1924 Lackawanna "Diner-Lounge", a 1942 Pullman Sleeper "American Liberty", and a vintage P&N caboose. Visitors also are allowed into the Piedmont & Northern's Business Car No 2101 "Carolina" built in 1914 and filled with mahogany and brass, used by the P&N board members, such as Mr James Self, and President Frank Cothran. A business car or office car was a 20th-century version of a private jet with the luxury and prestige of a yacht. The only other surviving P&N item is an electric freight locomotive at North Carolina Transportation Museum in Spencer. The railroad portion is located at 906 and 908 South Main Street.

The Museum is restoring a 1953 "Cinderella Coach" at the 106 facility for special photograph events. The coach was built in 1953 for a parade organized by Greenwood's social club ladies.
