= University of Maryland Global Campus people =

The following is a list of people related to University of Maryland Global Campus (formerly University of Maryland University College). The university president is Javier Miyares since 2012.

== Alumni ==
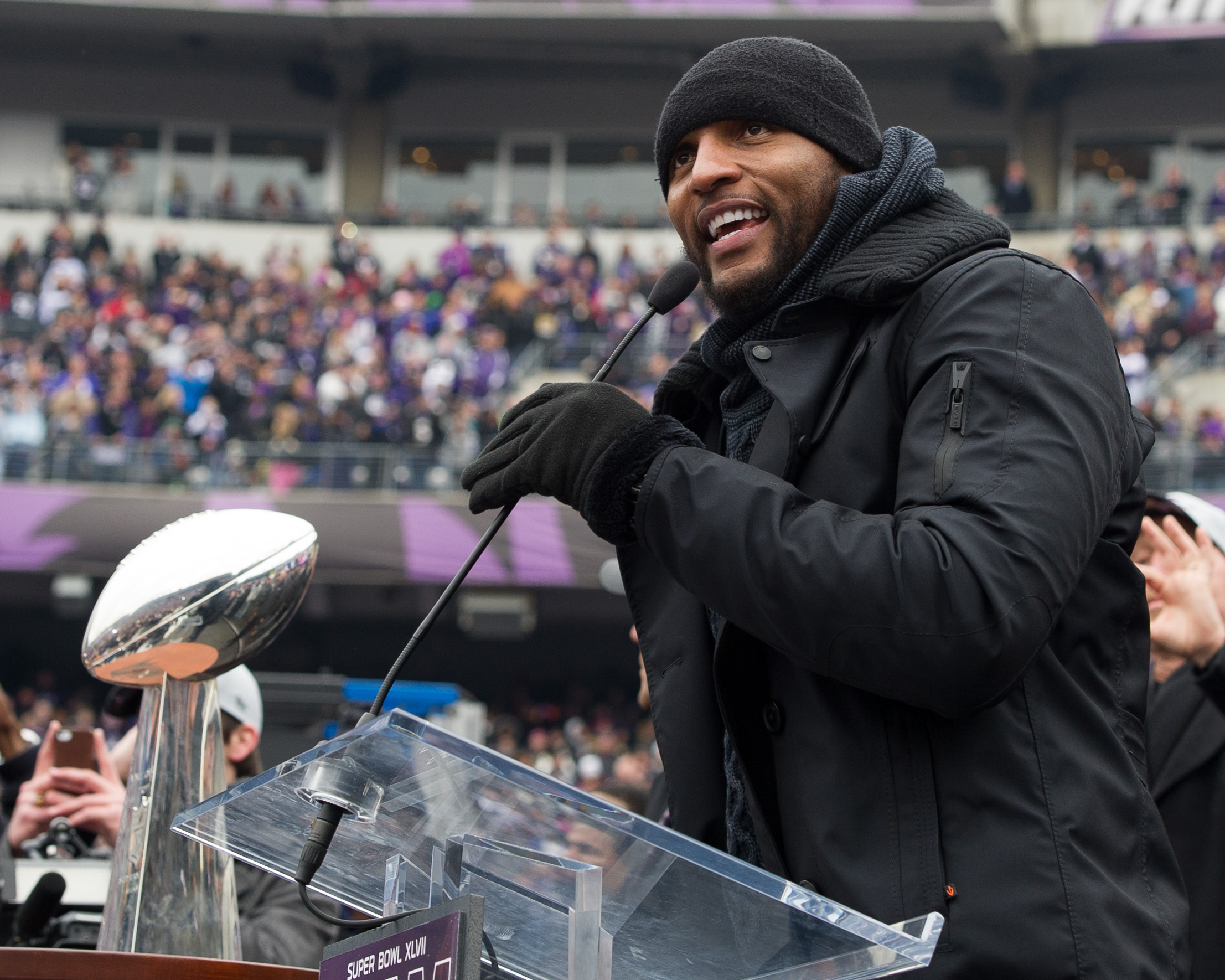
Baltimore Ravens player Ray Lewis

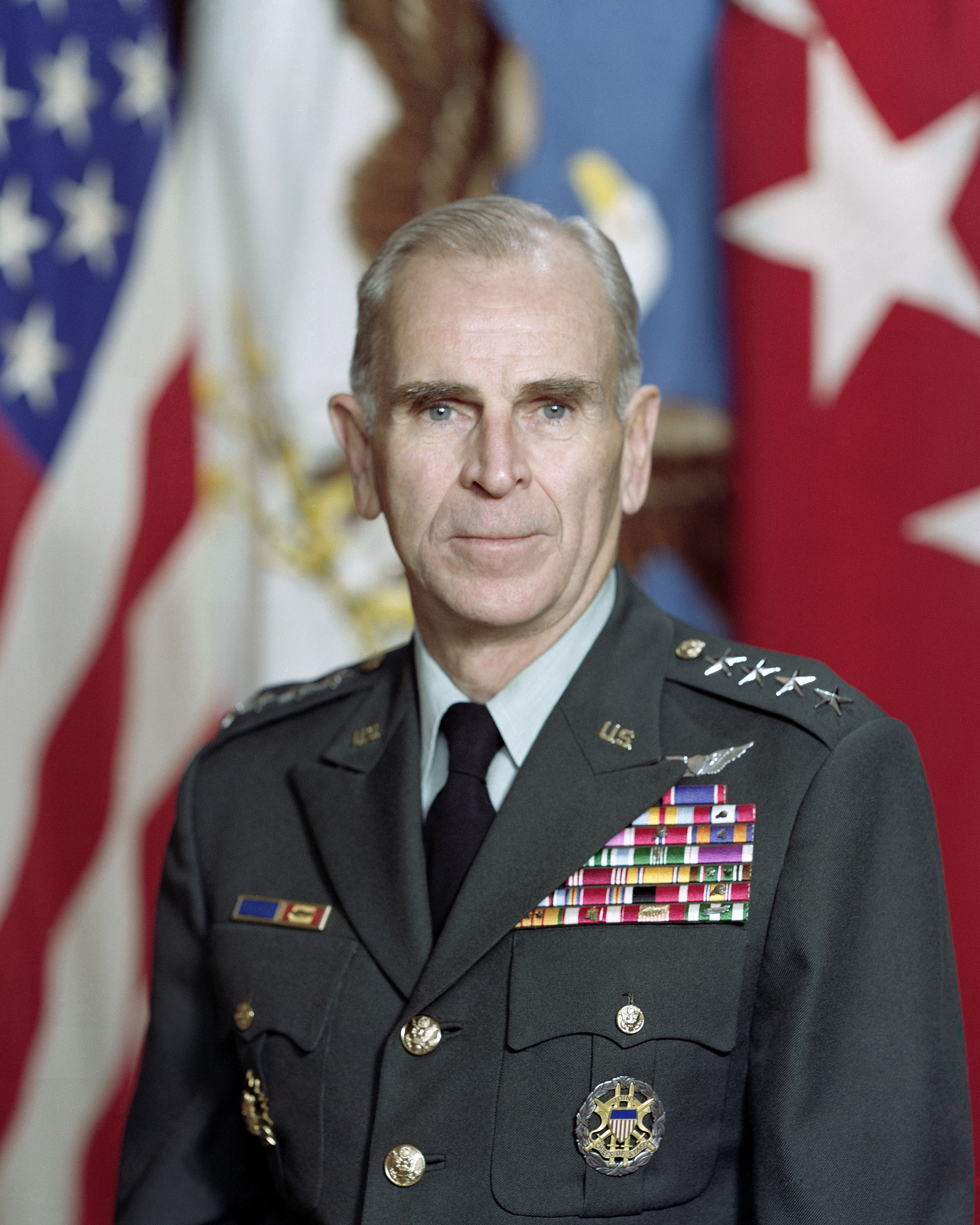
General John William Vessey, Jr., tenth Chairman of the Joint Chiefs of Staff

- Doreen Baingana
- Elizabeth Bobo
- Frank D. Celebrezze Jr.
- Sarah Cohen
- Said Durrah
- Dale Dye
- Hakan Fidan
- William D. Houser
- Thomas E. Hutchins
- Ray Lewis
- Edward J. Perkins
- James N. Robey
- Jalen Rose
- John William Vessey, Jr.
- John Bruce Wallace

== Faculty ==
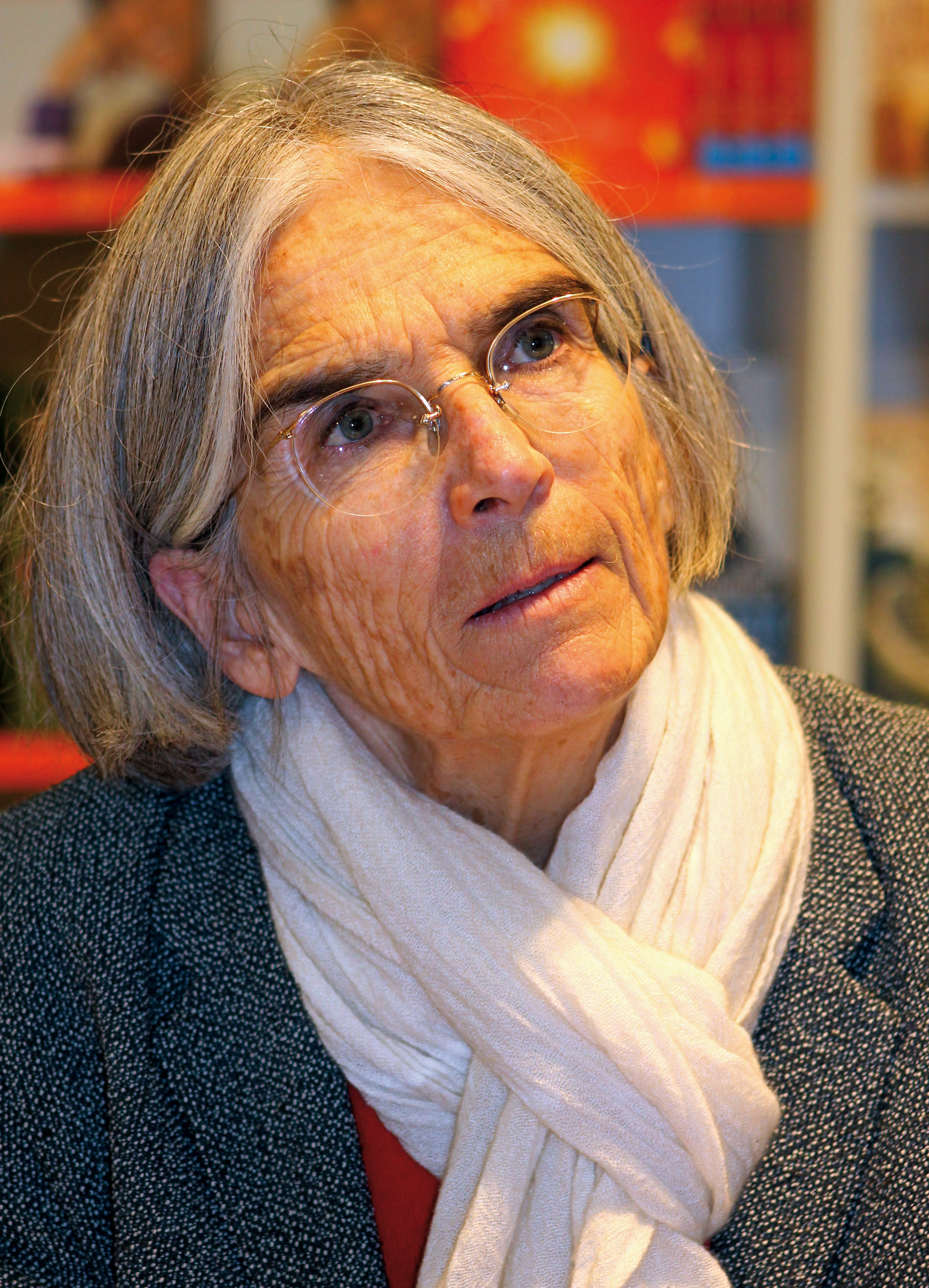
Donna Leon is a former faculty member at UMUC.

- Susan C. Aldridge
- G. "Anand" Anandalingam
- Jiří Březina
- Jeffrey Gramlich
- J. Greg Hanson
- John Benjamin Henck
- Karen Kwiatkowski
- Donna Leon
- Tobe Levin
- Patrick Mendis
- Arnold Resnicoff
- Leonard Swidler
