= Josiah Kilgore House =

Historic house in South Carolina, United States

- U.S. National Register of Historic Places
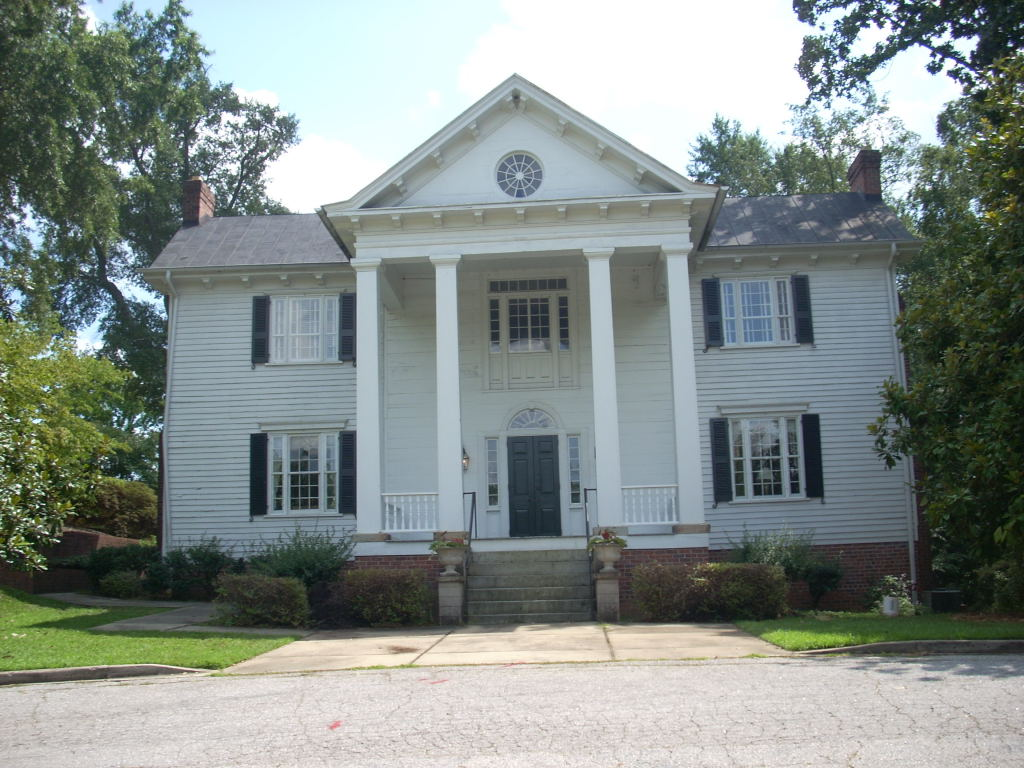
- Josiah Kilgore House, August 2009

- Location within South Carolina Location within the United States
- Location: N. Church and Academy Sts., Greenville, South Carolina
- Coordinates: 34°51′18″N 82°23′31″W
- Area: 5 acres (2.0 ha)
- Built: c. 1838
- Architectural style: Palladian
- NRHP reference No.: 75001699
- Added to NRHP: April 28, 1975

Josiah Kilgore House, now known as the Kilgore-Lewis House, is a historic home located at Greenville, South Carolina. It was built about 1838, and is a two-story, L-shaped, vernacular Palladian style dwelling on a low foundation. It features a pedimented portico supported by square posts. It has a projecting rear wing with a three-bay porch. The structure was moved to a five-acre site in McPherson Park to prevent its demolition.

The Kilgore-Lewis House serves as the headquarters for the Greenville Council of Garden Clubs, which provides tours of the house, arboretum and gardens.

It was added to the National Register of Historic Places in 1975.
