= Hanover House (Clemson University) =

Historic house in South Carolina, United States

- U.S. National Register of Historic Places
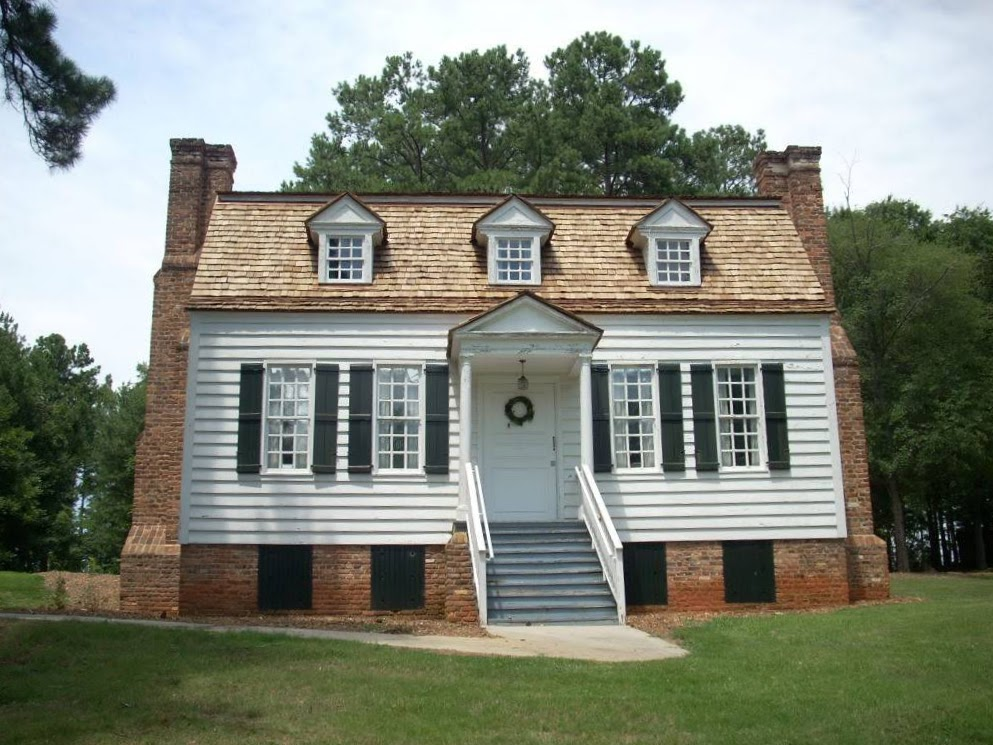
- Hanover House in the South Carolina Botanical Garden
- Location: Clemson University campus, Clemson, South Carolina postal address
- Coordinates: 34°40′30.8″N 82°49′05.3″W
- Built: 1714-1716
- Architect: Paul de St. Julien
- NRHP reference No.: 70000594
- Added to NRHP: June 5, 1970

Hanover House is a colonial house built by a French Huguenot family in 1714–1716, on the upper Cooper River in present-day Berkeley County of the South Carolina Low Country. The house is also known as the St. Julien-Ravenel House after its early owners.

When a state project to dam the river was dammed and create Lake Moultrie was proposed in the 1940s, it would have flooded the site of the house. To preserve the historic structure, the house was moved to the Clemson University campus in Pickens County, near the City of Clemson.

== History ==
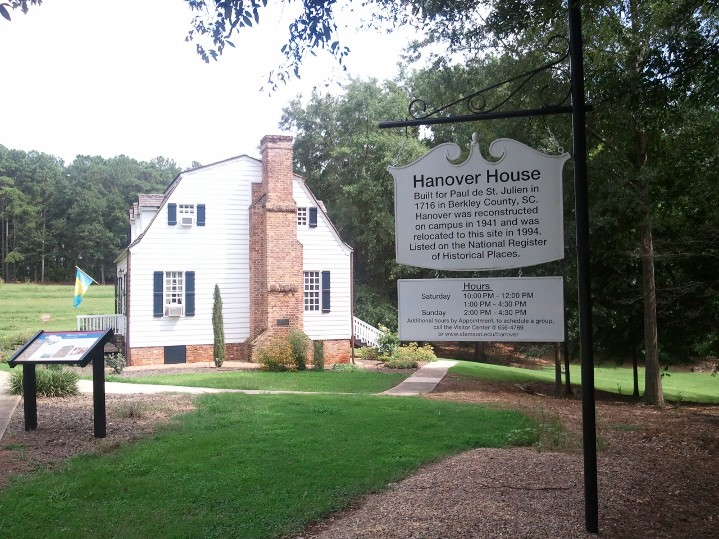
Sign for the Hanover House, with the house in the background.

Hanover House was built by Paul de St. Julien, an ethnic French Huguenot, on land by the Cooper River that was a 1688 grant to his grandfather by the Lords Proprietors of South Carolina. His grandfather had sought refuge in the colony from religious persecution by Catholics in France.

The house is a 1½-story cypress wood house with a gambrel roof. It has brick chimneys on either end of the house. There are fireplaces on both the first and second floor. Engraved on a stucco band at the top of one of the chimneys is PEU À PEU, representing the French proverb Peu à peu l'oiseau fait son nid, which is "Little by little, the bird builds his nest." St. Julien named the house Hanover in honor of the House of Hanover, which had ascended the throne of the Kingdom of Great Britain, "to show his appreciation for that country which had befriended so many Huguenot refugees after the Revocation of the Edict of Nantes." The plantation raised indigo and rice as commodity crops, dependent on labor of their enslaved Africans and African Americans.

St. Julien's daughter married Henry Ravenel. The house remained in the family for nearly 200 years.

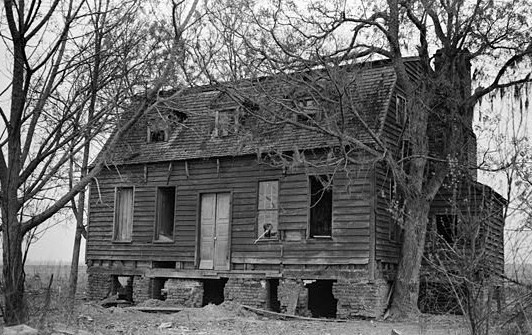
Hanover House in Berkeley County prior to its move to Clemson University

=== 20th century ===
In the 1930s the state proposed a project to construct a dam on the Cooper River for flood control and hydroelectric power, creating Lake Moultrie. This historic house and site would have been inundated by the large lake.

In 1941, the house was dismantled and moved to Clemson University, a public university in the northwest part of the state. It was reconstructed on the east side of campus on Cherry Road. In 1994, the house was dismantled again and relocated to the South Carolina Botanical Garden on the university campus. The house is furnished with period reproductions and donations by the Ravenel family.

The Hanover House was listed on the National Register of Historic Places (NRHP) in 1970.

The National Society of the Colonial Dames of America restored the interior of the house as a historic house museum. It is open to the public on weekends. Hours are Saturday, 10:00 a.m.- 12:00 noon & 1:00 p.m. - 4:30 p.m. and Sundays, 2:00 p.m. - 4:30 p.m.
