= South Carolina Botanical Garden =

Botanical garden on the campus of Clemson University in South Carolina, United States

Coordinates: 34.6736°N 82.8238°W

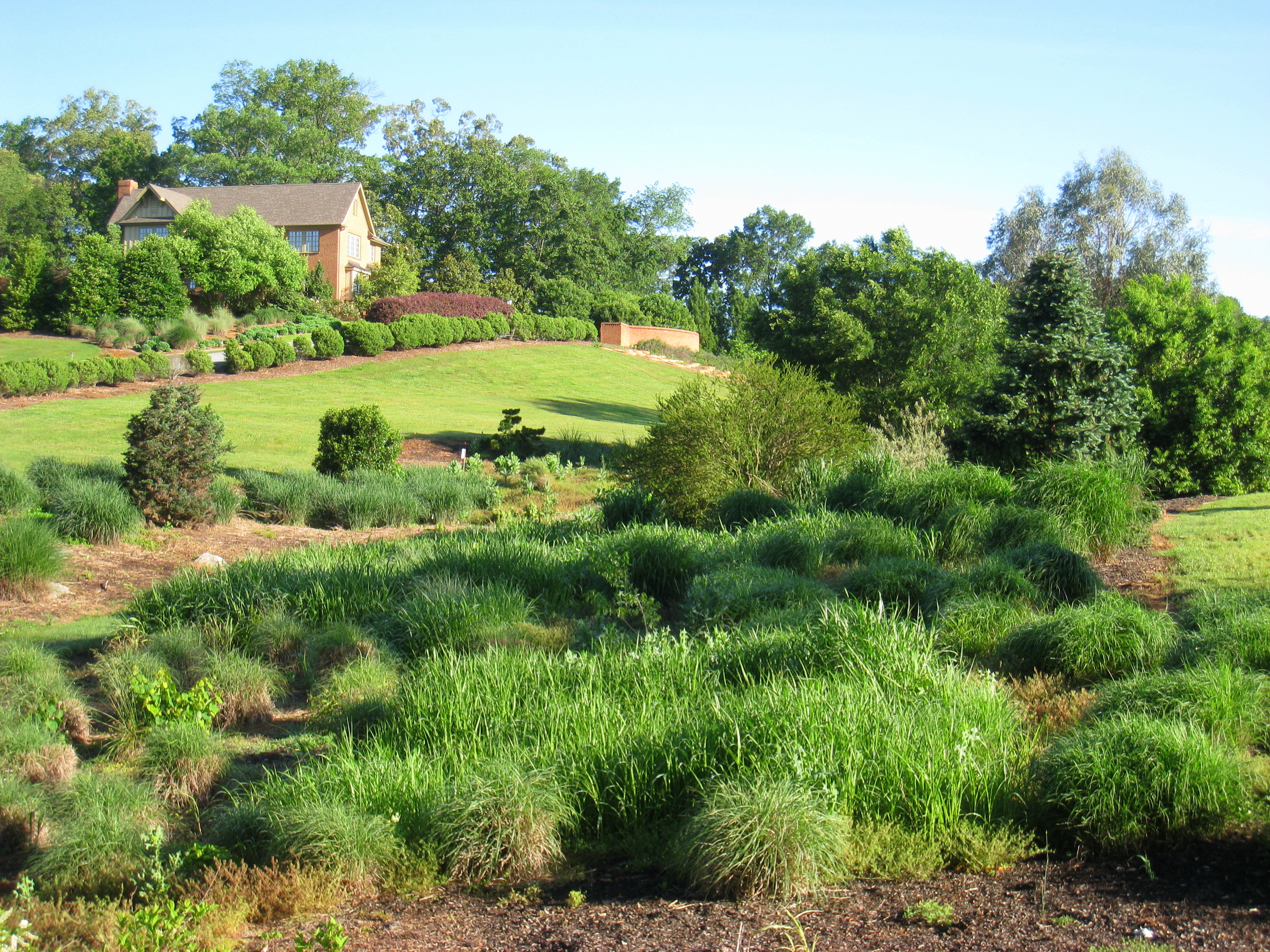
- Interactive map of South Carolina Botanical Garden
- Type: Botanical garden
- Location: Campus of Clemson University
- Nearest city: Clemson, South Carolina
- Area: 295 acres (1.19 km^{2})
- Website: www.clemson.edu/scbg/

The South Carolina Botanical Garden 295 acres (1.19 km^{2}) is located in Pickens County, South Carolina on the campus of Clemson University, adjacent to the City of Clemson. This garden has nature trails, pathways, ponds, streams, woodlands, trial gardens, the Bob Campbell Geology Museum, and the Fran Hanson Discovery Center, which has exhibits by local artists. It is open to the public every day of the week. The Bob Campbell Geology Museum features more than 10,000 rocks, minerals and fossils and has exhibits focused on geological and paleontological topics.

The gardens are the home of the historic Hanover House, which is an early 18th-century house built in the South Carolina Low Country and moved to the Clemson campus. It also has a pioneer village featuring the Hunt Log Cabin, which was originally built about 1825 in the Seneca, South Carolina area.

The South Carolina Botanical Garden features one of the largest collections of nature-based sculptures in the country. The extended-ephemeral pieces were each designed on-site by international artists and built by local volunteers and students within one month. Upon completion, the pieces begin to return to nature, so while many may still be found in the Garden, others have disappeared without a trace.

== See also ==
- List of botanical gardens in the United States
- List of museums in South Carolina
