= 2026 in South Carolina =

- Decades: 2000s; 2010s; 2020s
- See also: History of South Carolina; Historical outline of South Carolina; List of years in South Carolina; 2026 in the United States

The following is a list of events of the year 2026 in South Carolina.

== Incumbents ==
=== State government ===
- Governor: Henry McMaster (R)

== Events ==
- February 12 – Two people are killed and one injured in a shooting at a South Carolina State University dormitory in Orangeburg. Police say the shooting is connected to a marijuana deal.
- March 2 – The Reverend Jesse Jackson, who died in Chicago on February 17, lies in state at the South Carolina State House.
- May 13 – The South Carolina Supreme Court overturns the murder convictions of Alex Murdaugh, who was convicted of killing his wife and son in 2021. The justices rule that comments made by county clerk Becky Hill put undue influence on the jurors in favor of conviction.
- May 26 – The South Carolina Senate blocks a bill that would create a new congressional map, eliminating the state's one Democratic-leaning district.
- June 9 – U.S. Senator Lindsay Graham wins the Republican primary for his seat over a challenge from businessman Mark Lynch, who is part of the "America First" faction that has become critical of the Trump administration's foreign policy.
- July 11 — Lindsey Graham dies of an illness at age 71.
- July 13 – Governor McMaster appoints Lindsey Graham's sister Darline Graham to fulfill the remainder of his senate term.
- August 10 – The Department of Defense renames Joint Base Charleston to Joint Base Lindsey Graham.
- August 29 – A Columbia Police officer and a gunman are killed in a shoot-out at a park. A second officer is injured.
- October 13 – The ex-fiancé of Nancy Mace and two of his business associates are charged with sex crimes in connection to a 2018 assault against a woman on Sullivan's Island, prior to Mace's engagement. In February 2025, Mace had publicly accused her ex-fiancé and the other suspects of assault, saying she found photos and videos of multiple assaults on his phone.
- October 28 – A fire breaks out at the Savannah River National Laboratory in Aiken County, triggering an airspace closure.
- November 3 – 2026 South Carolina elections:
  - 2026 South Carolina House of Representatives election
  - 2026 South Carolina Attorney General election
  - 2026 South Carolina Commissioner of Agriculture election
  - 2026 South Carolina gubernatorial election: Alan Wilson wins the election.
  - 2026 United States House of Representatives elections in South Carolina
  - 2026 United States Senate election in South Carolina: In an upset, Annie Andrews beats incumbent senator Darlene Graham in the election.

== See also ==
- 2026 in the United States
