= 2022 in South Carolina =

- Decades: 2000s; 2010s; 2020s
- See also: History of South Carolina; Historical outline of South Carolina; List of years in South Carolina; 2022 in the United States

The following is a list of events of the year 2022 in South Carolina.

== Incumbents ==
=== State government ===
- Governor: Henry McMaster (R)

== Events ==
- April 5 – Tornado outbreak of April 4–5, 2022:
  - An ongoing tornado outbreak kills two people and produces a large tornado that hits Allendale, prompting the National Weather Service to issue a rare tornado emergency.
- April 16 – A mass shooting at a shopping mall near Columbia injures 12 people.
- June 27 – A federal judge in South Carolina lifts an injunction on the so-called heartbeat bill, effectively limiting abortion to about six weeks into pregnancy.
- July 2 – Tropical Storm Colin makes landfall in South Carolina.
- September 30 – Hurricane Ian makes its fourth landfall in South Carolina, after devastating portions of Florida and Cuba.

== See also ==
- 2023 in the United States
