= 2025 in South Carolina =

- Decades: 2000s; 2010s; 2020s
- See also: History of South Carolina; Historical outline of South Carolina; List of years in South Carolina; 2025 in the United States

The following is a list of events of the year 2025 in South Carolina.

== Incumbents ==
=== State government ===
- Governor: Henry McMaster (R)

== Events ==
=== March ===
- March 1 - Grammy nominated singer songwriter Angie Stone is killed in a car accident.
- March 2 – 2025 Southeastern United States wildfires
- March 7 – The state of South Carolina carry's out the execution of Brad Sigmon by firing squad. This was the first execution by firing squad since 2010, when Ronnie Lee Gardner from Utah was executed by firing squad.
- March 16 - Grammy nominated singer songwriter Jesse Colin Young dies.
- March 25 – 2025 South Carolina House of Representatives District 113 special election

=== April ===
- April 15 – The Hub City Spartanburgers Minor League Baseball team plays its first game.
- April 26 – 11 people are injured in a shooting in Myrtle Beach. The suspected gunman is shot and killed by police.
- April 30 – Limestone University, located in Gaffney, announces it will close at the end of the semester after a $6 million funding drive failed.

=== May ===
- May 25 – 11 people are injured, ten by gunfire, in a shooting on a charter boat in Little River.

=== June ===
- June 3 - 24-year-old Bishopville City Councilman Keishan Scott is elected to the State Legislature. He is the youngest member of the State Legislature and the youngest to be elected to the body since 2016.
- June 11 – State Representative RJ May is charged with ten federal counts of child pornography.
- June 24 – 20 people are struck by lightning at a park on Lake Murray in Lexington, including 12 children. All of the injured sustain non-life-threatening injuries.

=== August ===
- August 11 – State Representative RJ May resigns from office amid federal child porn charges.
- August 16 – Governor McMaster directs the South Carolina National Guard to deploy 200 troops to Washington, D.C. to support the federal takeover of law enforcement in the capital.

=== October ===
- October 4 – Three people are injured in a fire at an Edisto Island home, including former State Senator Arnold Goodstein. His wife, circuit court judge Diane Goodstein, is not home at the time.
- October 12 – Four people are killed and 20 injured in a shooting at a St. Helena Island bar.

=== November ===
- November 4 – 2025 Columbia mayoral election: Columbia Mayor Daniel Rickenmann wins reelection.

== Deaths ==
- November 3 – Barbara R. Hatton, the first woman to serve as president of South Carolina State University

== See also ==
- 2025 in the United States
