= 1788 in South Carolina =

- Decades: 1750s; 1760s; 1770s; 1780s; 1790s
- See also: History of South Carolina; Historical outline of South Carolina; List of years in South Carolina; 1778 in the United States

The following is a list of events of the year 1788 in South Carolina.

== Incumbents ==
=== State government ===
- Governor: Thomas Pinckney

== Events ==
- May 23 – The Union ratifies the Province of South Carolina, bringing it into the union.
- The Old Brick Church is constructed in Fairfield County.

== See also ==
- 1788 in the United States
