= 2023 in South Carolina =

- Decades: 2000s; 2010s; 2020s
- See also: History of South Carolina; Historical outline of South Carolina; List of years in South Carolina; 2023 in the United States

The following is a list of events of the year 2023 in South Carolina.

== Incumbents ==
=== State government ===
- Governor: Henry McMaster (R)

== Events ==
- February 14 – Nikki Haley 2024 presidential campaign: Former Governor of South Carolina and United States ambassador to the United Nations Nikki Haley officially announces her run for president in the 2024 election. She was the first major Republican challenger to former president Donald Trump.
- May 19 – The United States confirms a case of bovine spongiform encephalopathy, also known as mad cow disease, in a slaughter plant in South Carolina.
- September 27 – A United States Marine Corps pilot ejects from his F-35 fighter jet above North Charleston. The pilot lands safely, while the aircraft is missing, with search efforts focused on two nearby lakes.

== See also ==
- 2023 in the United States
