= 2024 in South Carolina =

- Decades: 2000s; 2010s; 2020s
- See also: History of South Carolina; Historical outline of South Carolina; List of years in South Carolina; 2024 in the United States

The following is a list of events of the year 2024 in South Carolina.

== Incumbents ==
=== State government ===
- Governor: Henry McMaster (R)

== Events ==
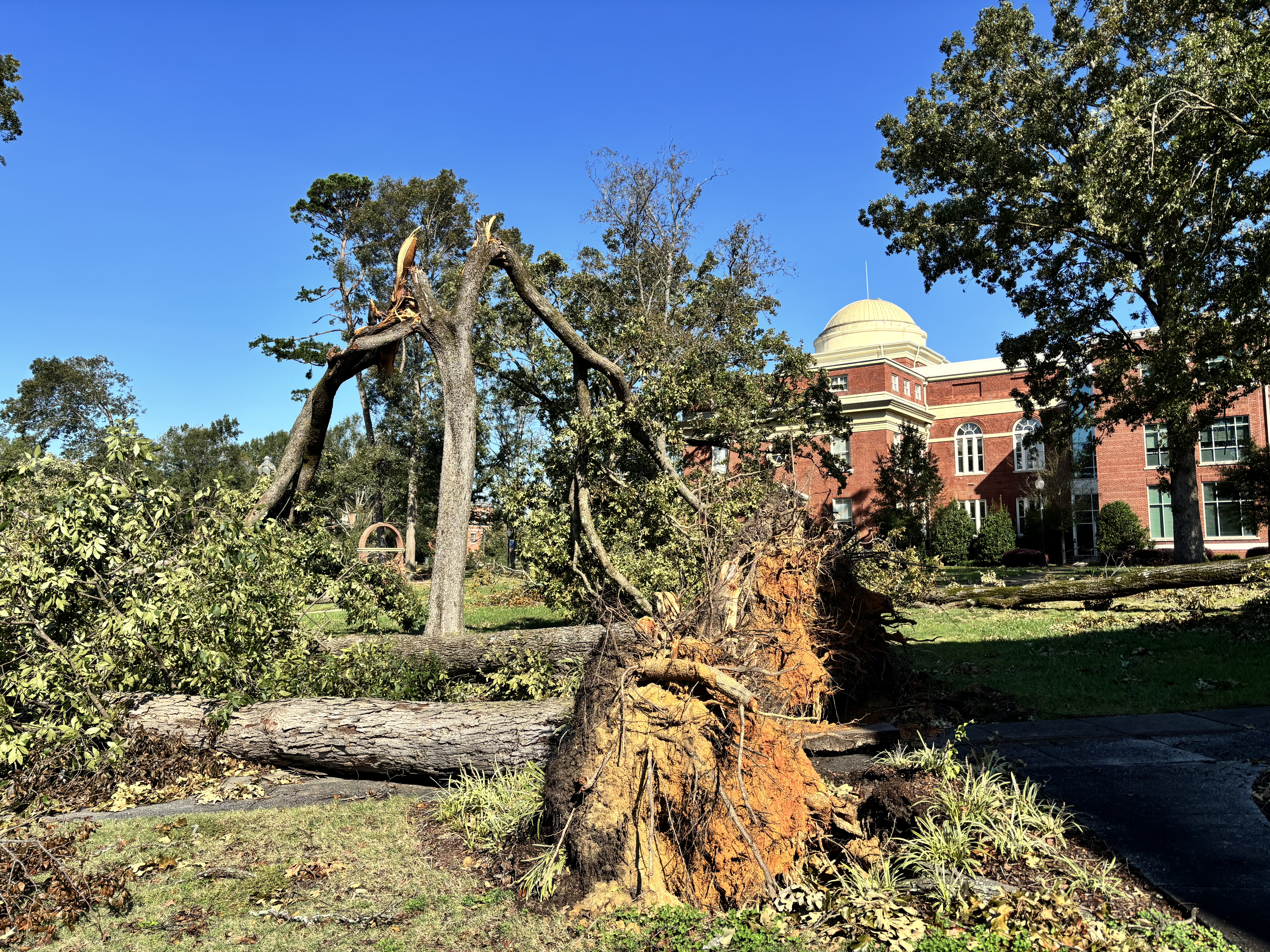
Damaged and uprooted trees on the campus of Presbyterian College in Clinton following the impact of Hurricane Helene.

- February 3 – 2024 Democratic Party presidential primaries
  - U.S. president Joe Biden wins the 2024 South Carolina Democratic presidential primary.
- February 24 – 2024 Republican Party presidential primaries
  - Donald Trump wins the 2024 South Carolina Republican presidential primary.
- March 6 – Nikki Haley 2024 presidential campaign
  - Former South Carolina governor and U.S. ambassador Nikki Haley ends her presidential campaign.
- August 8 – Tropical Storm Debby makes its second landfall near Bulls Bay.
- September 29 – The death toll from Hurricane Helene increases to 27 in South Carolina.
- September 20 – South Carolina carries out its first execution since 2011 in September.
- November 5 –
  - 2024 United States presidential election in South Carolina
  - 2024 South Carolina House of Representatives election

== See also ==
- 2024 in the United States
