= Francis Butler Simkins =

American historian (1897–1966)

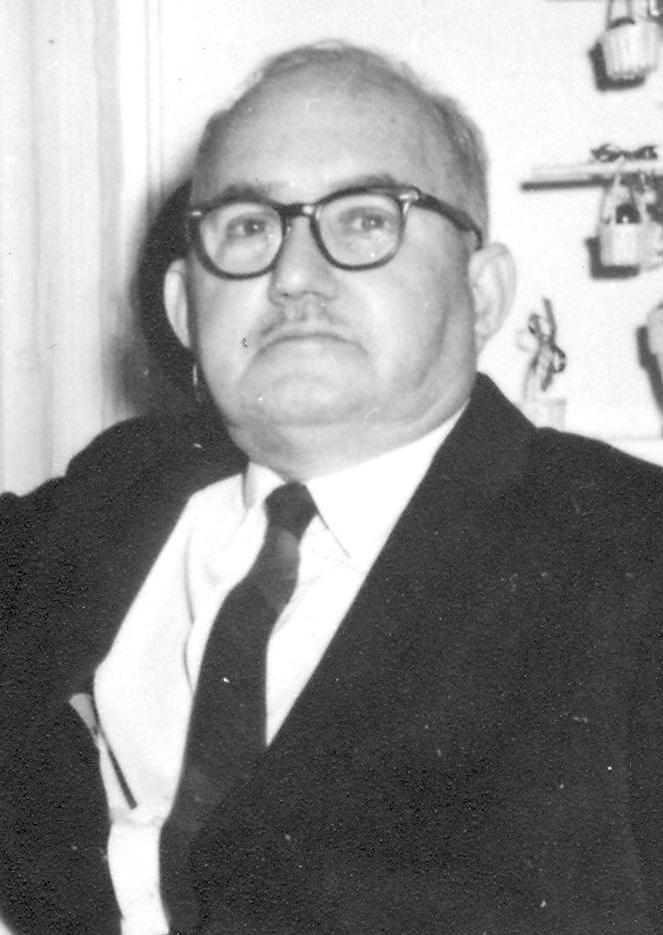
- Born: December 14, 1897; Edgefield, South Carolina, U.S.
- Died: February 8, 1966 (aged 68)

Francis Butler Simkins (December 14, 1897 – February 8, 1966) was a historian and president of the Southern Historical Association. He is best known for his highly praised history of the Reconstruction Era in South Carolina, that gave fair coverage to all sides, and for his widely used textbook The South, Old and New (1947) and his monographs on South Carolina history. He was a professor at Longwood College in Virginia, Simkins was a leading progressive in the 1920s and 1930s regarding race relations but became a defender of segregation in the 1950s and 1960s.

== Career ==
Born in Edgefield, South Carolina, Simkins received his B.A. from the University of South Carolina in 1918 and his M.A. (1921) and Ph.D. (1929) from Columbia University in New York. He spent most of his academic career as a professor of history at the small Longwood College in Farmville, Virginia.

Simkins also taught at Louisiana State University, where he was a mentor of Charles P. Roland, another historian of the South and the Civil War.

=== Scholarship ===
Simkins published eight history books, numerous scholarly articles, and an abundance of miscellaneous work including book reviews and encyclopedia articles. His obituary in The Journal of America History in 1966 said that Simkins was "an emancipated critic of the old order" and that "he came to stress the distinctive characteristics of 'the everlasting South', and to question the validity of much that passed for progress in the modern South."

Simkins' most famous work covers South Carolina history. In South Carolina During Reconstruction (with Robert Hilliard Woody) (1931) he broke with the Dunning School and gave a well-balanced history. It was an objective study of Reconstruction and "represented an important step forward" in its study. Howard K. Beale praised it: "With refreshing freedom from prejudice and special pleading, the authors picture honest, unselfish carpetbaggers, respectable, well-meaning scalawags, and Negroes with intelligence and political ability." W.E.B. Du Bois wrote that the book "does not hesitate to give a fair account of the Negroes and of some of their work."

In Pitchfork Ben Tillman (1944) Simkins covered the highly controversial politician Benjamin Tillman who served as the violently anti-black white supremacist governor of South Carolina from 1890 to 1894 and as a United States Senator from 1895 until his death in 1918, known for his numerous speeches.

A colorful if eccentric professor at Longwood College in Virginia, Simpkins was a leading progressive in the 1920s and 1930s regarding race relations, but became more conservative in the 1950s and 1960s, in part because his wife taught nearby in the Prince Edward County, Virginia public schools, which became a companion case to Brown v. Board of Education and thus a touchpoint of Massive Resistance.

Simkins in the 1920s could cross racial lines in his scholarship and challenge the "Lost Cause" theme in the 1930s. When desegregation began in the 1950s Simkins discovered much he thought should be preserved, and he became a spokesman for preserving it as a tradition. In a 1954 address to the Southern Historical Association he said that historians of the South "should accept the class and race distinctions" of the region and "display a tolerant understanding of why in the South the Goddess of Justice has not always been blind, [and] why there have been lynchings and Jim Crow laws." By 1964 David Potter says he was, "almost the only practicing historian of the South who defends the major and historic Southern institution of segregation." In 2015, after Harper Lee released her novel Go Set a Watchman, historian David B. Parker called him "The Historian Who Evolved the Same Way as Atticus Finch".

Simkins was one of the authors of the seventh grade textbook "Virginia: History, Government, Geography" used in Virginia public schools from the 1950s to the 1970s. Washington Post columnist Dana Milbank published excerpts and summed up the book as "[h]istorically wrong and morally bankrupt — but for tender White minds, discomfort-free." One of the excerpts reads:

Life among the Negroes of Virginia in slavery times was generally happy. The Negroes went about in a cheerful manner making a living for themselves and for those for whom they worked.

=== Major works ===
The contributions of Simkins in the field of southern history were extensive:

- 1926 - The Tillman Movement in South Carolina, a thesis published by Duke University, online
- 1926 - "The Tillman Movement in South Carolina," Journal of Negro History (1926) 11#3 pp. 538–539 in JSTOR read online
- 1927 - "The Ku Klux Klan in South Carolina, 1868-1871," Journal of Negro History (1927) 12#4 pp. 606–647 in JSTOR
- 1931 - South Carolina During Reconstruction (with Robert Hilliard Woody)) (University of North Carolina Press). won the Dunning Prize of 1931 as the first revisionist work on Reconstruction read online
- 1936 - The Women of the Confederacy (with James Welch Patton) — one of the first serious scholarly studies of women in southern history. Reprinted: Scholarly Press (1971), ISBN 0-403-01212-0
- 1937 - "Ben Tillman's View of the Negro," Journal of Southern History (1937) 3#2 pp. 161–174 in JSTOR
- "New Viewpoints of Southern Reconstruction," Journal of Southern History (1939) 5#1 pp 49–61 in JSTOR
- 1944 - Pitchfork Ben Tillman: South Carolina. University of South Carolina Press (reprinted 2002), ISBN 1-57003-477-X. read online
- 1947 - "The Everlasting South," Journal of Southern History 13 (Aug 1947), 307-22.
- 1947 - The South Old and New: 1820-1947 - later (1957) revised: A History of the South, Publisher: Random House; 4th edition (1972), ISBN 0-394-31646-0.
- 1955 - "Tolerating the South's Past," Journal of Southern History (1955) 21#1 pp. 3–16 in JSTOR, his presidential address to the Southern Historical Association read online
- 1957 - Virginia: History, Government, Geography - a seventh-grade textbook used in Virginia public schools until the 1970s from which Simkins said bureaucrats made him remove some of the more embarrassing features like descriptions of the filth of the towns. OCLC 3512462
- 1963 - The Everlasting South - a group of essays emphasizing the region's deep-rooted conservativism, OCLC 487841

=== Honors ===
The triennial Francis B. Simkins Award is awarded by the Southern Historical Association for best first book about the South.

In addition to the Dunning Prize, Simkins held research fellowships at the Social Science Research Council and the John Guggenheim Memorial Foundation, delivered the Fleming Lectures at LSU, and the Centennial Lectures at the University of Mississippi. He was president of the Southern Historical Association in 1953-1954.
