= History of South Carolina =

South Carolina was one of the Thirteen Colonies that first formed as United States. European exploration of the area began in April 1540 with the Hernando de Soto expedition, which unwittingly introduced diseases that decimated the local Native American population. In 1663, the English Crown granted land to eight proprietors of what became the colony. The first settlers came to the Province of Carolina at the port of Charleston in 1670. They were mostly wealthy planters and their slaves coming from the English Caribbean colony of Barbados. By 1700 the colony was exporting deerskin, cattle, rice, and naval stores (such as masts and turpentine). The Province of Carolina was split into North and South Carolina in 1712. Pushing back the Native Americans in the Yamasee War (1715–1717), colonists next overthrew the proprietors' rule in the Revolution of 1719, seeking more direct representation. In 1719, South Carolina became a crown colony.

In the Stamp Act Crisis of 1765, South Carolina banded together with the other colonies to oppose British taxation and played a major role in resisting Great Britain. In March 1776, South Carolina statesmen adopted a temporary system of provincial government, a precursor to the signing of the Declaration of Independence on July 4, 1776. During the American Revolutionary War, South Carolina was the site of major activity amongst the American colonies, with more than 200 battles and skirmishes fought within the state. South Carolina became the eighth state to ratify the U.S. Constitution on May 23, 1788.

Upon South Carolina's statehood, the state's economy was centered on the cultivation of cotton on plantations in the sea islands and Low Country, along with rice, indigo and some tobacco as commodity crops, which was worked by indentured servants, most from America. The invention of the cotton gin enabled profitable processing of short-staple cotton, which grew better in the Piedmont than did long-staple cotton. The hilly upland areas, where landowners were generally subsistence farmers with few slaves, were much poorer; a regional conflict between the coastal and inland areas developed in the political system, long dominated by the Low Country planters. In the early-to-mid 19th century, with outspoken leaders such as John C. Calhoun, the state vied with Virginia as the dominant political and social force in the South. It fought federal tariffs in the 1830s and demanded that its rights to practice slavery be recognized in newly established territories. With the 1860 election of Republicans under Abraham Lincoln, who vowed to prevent slavery's expansion, many voters demanded secession. In December 1860, the state was the first to secede from the Union, and in February 1861, it joined the new Confederate States of America.

The American Civil War began in April 1861, when Confederate forces attacked the American fort at Fort Sumter in Charleston harbor. After the collapse of the Confederacy in 1865, South Carolina underwent Reconstruction from 1865 to 1877. The Civil War would ruin the states economy, and continued reliance on agriculture cultivation as its main economic base, made South Carolina one of the poorer states economically in the country. During Reconstruction, Congress shut down the civilian government in 1867, put the army in charge, gave African American men the opportunity to vote, and prevented former Confederates from holding office. A Republican legislature supported by Freedmen, northern carpetbaggers and local white Southern scalawags, created and funded a public school system, and created social welfare institutions. The constitution they passed was kept nearly unaltered for 27 years, and most legislation passed during the Reconstruction years lasted longer than that.

During the late 19th century, conservative Southern Democrats calling themselves "Redeemers", had regained political power. In the 1880s, Jim Crow laws were passed that were especially severe in the state, to create public segregation and control movement of African American laborers. After 1890, almost all blacks had lost their political voice due to disfranchisement. State educational levels were low, as public schools were underfunded, especially for African Americans. Most people lived on small farms and grew crops such as cotton. The more affluent landowners subdivided their land into farms operated by tenant farmers or sharecroppers, along with land operated by the owner using hired labor. Gradually more industry moved into the Piedmont area, with textile factories that processed the state's raw cotton into yarn and cloth for sale on the international market.

In the first half of the 20th century, many blacks left the state to go to northern cities during the Great Migration. During the Jim Crow era, segregation was rigidly enforced, limiting African Americans' chances for education, free public movement, and closing them out of the political system. The federal Civil Rights laws of the 1960s ended segregation, and protected the voting rights of African Americans. Until the mid-20th century, the state was politically a part of the Democratic Solid South. Many African Americans had been affiliated with the Republican Party, but after 1964, became mostly loyal Democrats, while most white conservatives flipped to being Republican.

During the mid-to-late 20th century, South Carolina started to grow more economically. The main economic driver of cotton production started to fade during the mid-20th century, due to mechanization. As more factories were built across the state, the great majority of farmers left agriculture occupations for jobs in other economic sectors. Service industries such as tourism, education, and medical care would grow rapidly within the state. Textile factories started to fade after the 1970s, with offshore movement of those jobs to other countries. By the late 20th century, South Carolina voted solidly Republican in presidential elections, although state and local government elections would be contested by both parties. In the early 21st century South Carolina's economic industries included markets such as aerospace, agribusiness, automotive manufacturing, and tourism. By the 2020 U.S. census, South Carolina's population had reached 5 million.

== Pre-Columbian history ==
The earliest date of human habitation in what would later become South Carolina is disputed. Since the 1930s, the prevailing theory concerning the Settlement of the Americas is that the first human inhabitants were the Clovis people, who are thought to have appeared approximately 13,500 years ago. Artifacts of the Clovis people have been found throughout most of the United States and beyond, including South Carolina. Since the early 21st century, however, this standard theory has been challenged based on the discovery and dating of pre-Clovis sites. One of these, the Topper Site, is located on the Savannah River in modern-day Allendale County. In 2004, worked stone tools were found there were dated by radiocarbon techniques possibly to 50,000 years ago, but those dates are highly disputed. Regardless, the first stage of human habitation is termed the Lithic stage, and marked by the widespread use of lithic flaked stone tools for hunting. Around 10,000 BCE, they began to use spears and hunted big game. At the time this would have included the Elk, White-tailed deer, and American bison, and possibly some species of Pleistocene megafauna.

During the Archaic period of 8000 to 2000 BCE, the peoples of South Carolina gathered nuts, berries, fish and shellfish as part of their diets. Trade between the coastal plain and the piedmont developed. Stallings Island, located in modern-day Georgia close to its border with South Carolina, is home to the oldest known pottery in North America. Beginning as early as 3,800 BCE, Stallings Island-style fiber-tempered pottery spread down the Savannah River and along the coast to the north and south. Stallings Culture sites were semi-permanent; pottery here preceded crop domestication and inhabitants relied mainly on shellfish harvesting. After about 500 years, Stallings Culture sites disappear from the archeological record for as yet unclear reasons.

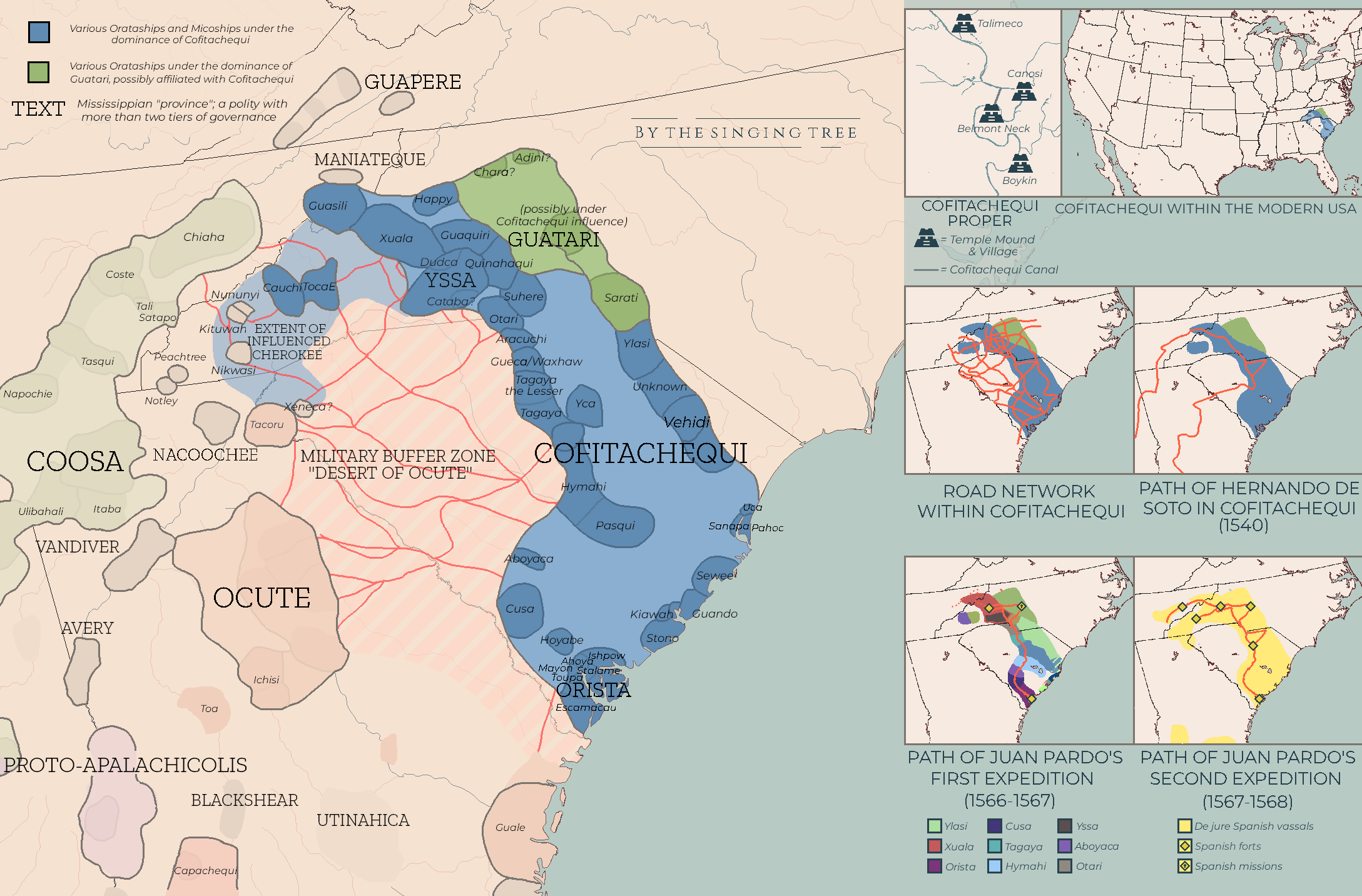
The polity of Cofitachequi at its peak size controlling much of what is now the Carolinas with a large desolate buffer zone between them and their rival Ocute.

The Woodland Period began around 1000 BCE, lasting (depending on the chronology used) until contact with Europeans. It saw the development of higher intensity agriculture, more complex pottery, and the bow and arrow. From 800 BCE to 700 CE, the coastal regions of South Carolina participated in the Deptford culture. This culture was characterized by the appearance of elaborate ceremonial complexes, increasing social and political complexity, mound burial, permanent settlements, population growth, and an increasing reliance on cultivated plants. After 800 CE, the Deptford Culture was superseded by the Early Mississippian Culture, with the peoples of South Carolina belonging to the South Appalachian Mississippian sub-group. It is believed that they adopted Mississippian traits from their northwestern neighbors. In the Midlands and Lowcountry, typical settlements were located on riverine floodplains and included villages with defensive palisades enclosing platform mounds and residential areas. In the Piedmont, villages with single platform mounds were more typical of the river valley settlements. Mississippian sites in South Carolina include Chauga Mound and Adamson Mounds. From 1200 CE, archeological artefacts from South Carolina exhibit the characteristics of the Southeastern Ceremonial Complex, a regional stylistic similarity of artifacts, iconography, ceremonies, and mythology of the Mississippian culture. It coincided with their adoption of maize agriculture and the growth of large polities. By contact, much of the state was dominated by Cofitachequi, ruled by the Lady of Cofitachequi, who fought with their rival Ocute in present day Georgia.

By the time of the European settlement, 29 nations of Native Americans, divided by major language families, lived within the boundaries of what became South Carolina. These peoples are generally considered part of the Southeastern Woodlands cultural region. Algonquian-speaking nations lived in the low country, Siouan-speaking and Iroquoian-speaking in the Piedmont and uplands, respectively.

== Colonial period ==
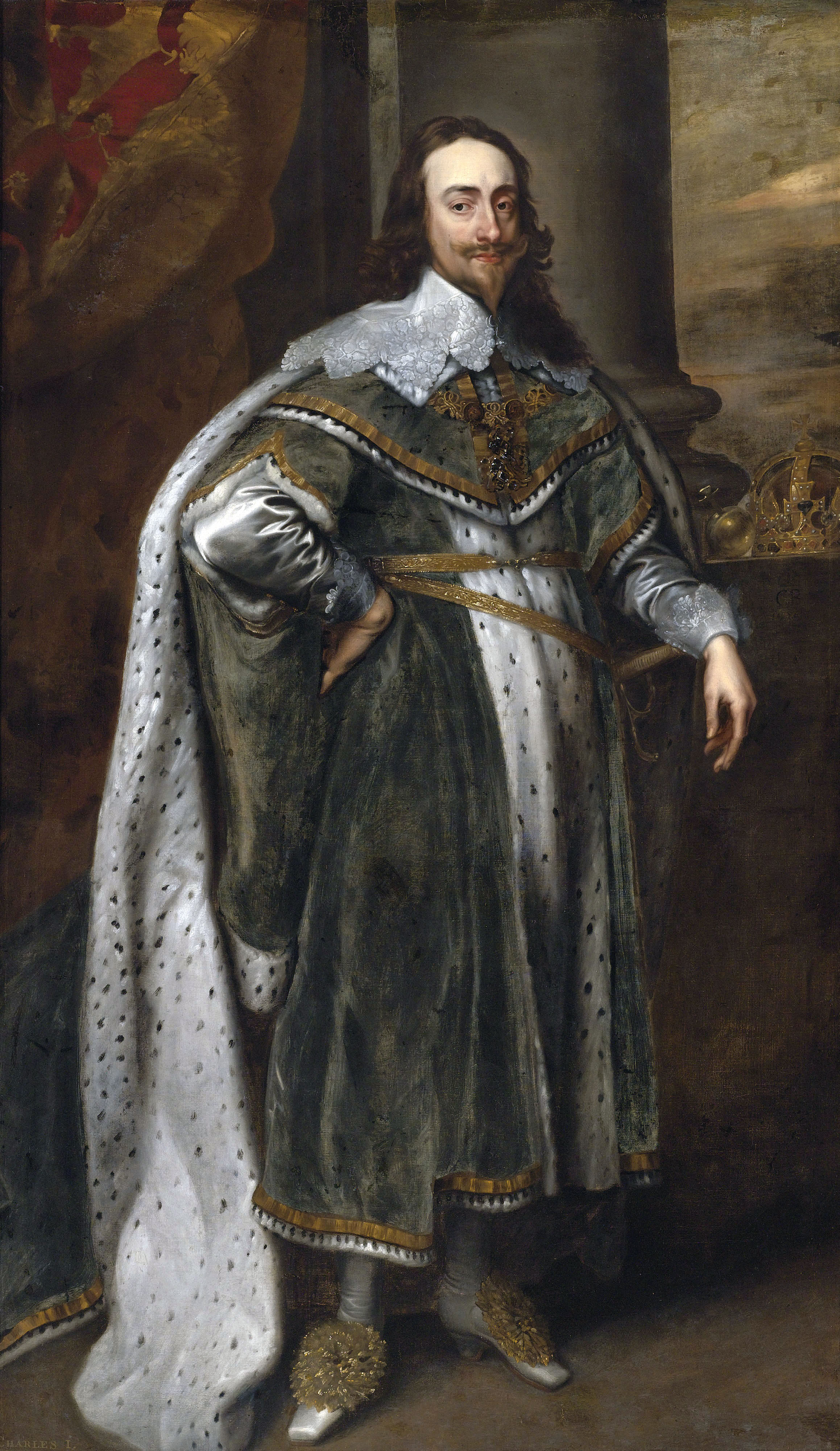
South Carolina is named after King Charles I of England. Carolina is taken from the Latin word for "Charles", Carolus.

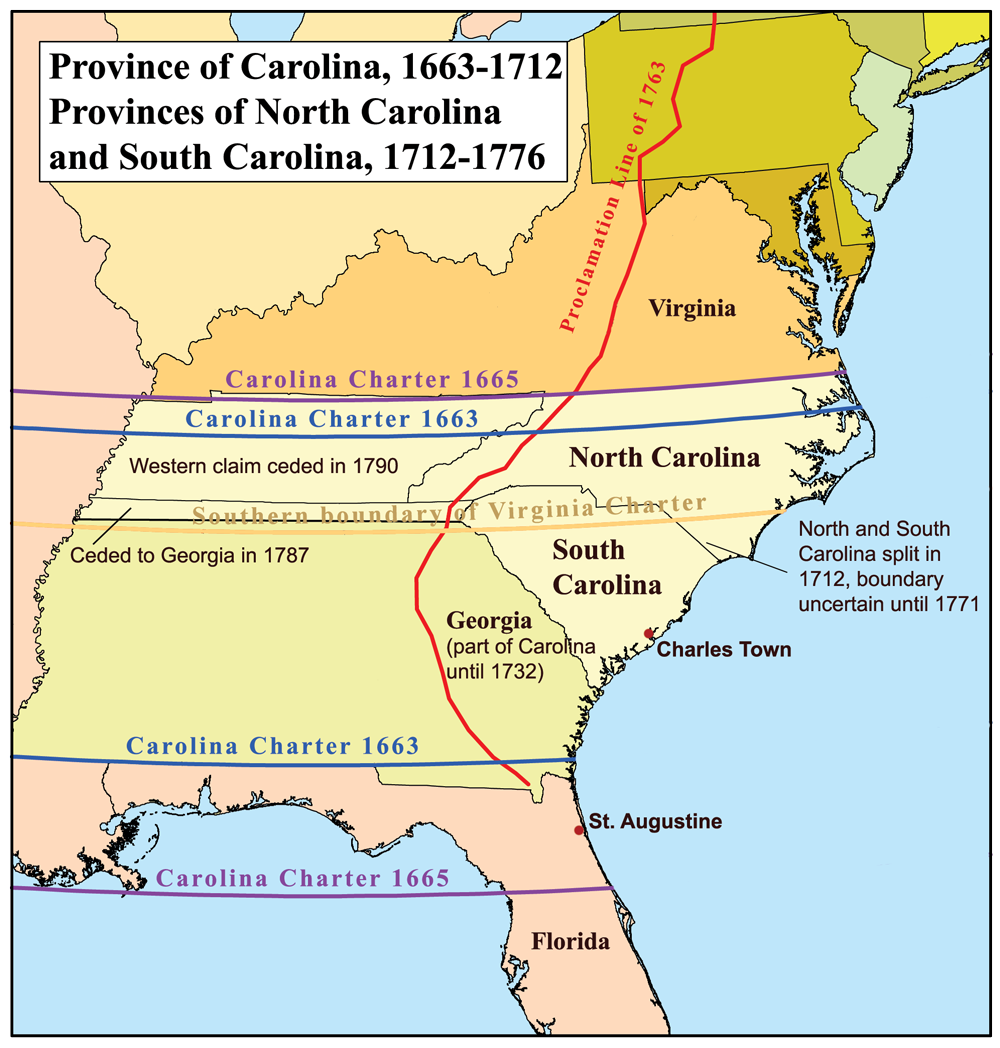
South Carolina was formed in 1712.

By the end of the 16th century, the Spanish and French had left the area of South Carolina after several reconnaissance missions, expeditions and failed colonization attempts, notably the short-living French outpost of Charlesfort followed by the Spanish town of Santa Elena on modern-day Parris Island between 1562 and 1587. In 1629, Charles I, king of England, granted his attorney general a charter to everything between latitudes 36 and 31. He called this land the Province of Carolana, which would later be changed to "Carolina" for pronunciation, after the Latin form of his own name.

In 1663, Charles II granted the land to the eight Lords Proprietors in return for their financial and political assistance in restoring him to the throne in 1660. Charles II intended that the newly created Province of Carolina would serve as an English bulwark to the contested lands claimed by Spanish Florida and prevent Spanish expansion northward. The eight nobles ruled the Province of Carolina as a proprietary colony. After the Yamasee War of 1715–1717, the Lords Proprietors came under increasing pressure from settlers and were forced to relinquish their charter to the Crown in 1719. The proprietors retained their right to the land until 1719, when the South Carolina was officially made a crown colony.

In April 1670, settlers arrived at Albemarle Point, at the confluence of the Ashley and Cooper rivers. They founded Charles Town, named in honor of King Charles II. Throughout the Colonial Period, the Carolinas participated in many wars against the Spanish and the Native Americans, including the Yamasee and Cherokee tribes. In its first decades, the colony's plantations were relatively small and its wealth came from Native American trade, mainly in Native American slaves and deerskins.

The slave trade adversely affected tribes throughout the Southeast and exacerbated enmity and competition among some of them. Historians estimate that Carolinians exported 24,000–51,000 Native American slaves from 1670 to 1717, sending them to markets ranging from Boston in North America to Barbados. Planters financed the purchase of African slaves by their sale of Native Americans, finding that they were somewhat easier to control, as they did not know the territory to make good an escape.

The 1760s saw the creation of the Regulators, one of the first organized militias in the New World. The militia proposed ideas of independence and brought increased recognition to the need for backcountry rights in the Carolinas. The Regulators in South Carolina were distinct from the Regulator Movement in North Carolina, though they had similar aims.

=== Native people ===
Divided roughly along the Santee River were the two main groups of Native American peoples— Eastern Siouan and the Cusaboan tribes. Relative to the Siouans were mostly the Waccamaw, Sewee, Woccon, Chickanee (a smaller offshoot of the northern Wateree), Winyah, and the Santee (not to be confused with the Dakota Santee of the west.). Most of the region south of the Santee River was controlled by the Muskogean Cusabo tribes. Some Muskogean speaking tribes, like the Coree lived among the Siouans, however. North of the Sewee were the Croatan, an Algonquian nation related to the Chowanoke, Piscataway, Nanticoke, and Powhatan further north. Many descendants of the Croatan survive among the Lumbee, who also took in many Siouan peoples of the region. Deeper inland were the lands of the Chalaques, or ancestral Cherokees.

Other tribes who entered the region over time were the Westo, an Iroquoian people believed to have been the same as the Erie Indians of Ohio. During the Beaver Wars period, they were pushed out of their homeland by the Iroquois in the 1650s and as refugees migrated from near Lake Erie into South Carolina where they specialized in capturing and marketing Indian slaves to white South Carolinians. The Westo were destroyed in 1681 by the "Savannah" (Shawnee) and whites. The Shawnee were also recent immigrants to South Carolina and took over the slave trading of the Westo.

The Chalaques split into the Yuchi of North Carolina and the Cherokee to the south, with other fragment groups wandering off into different areas. Also, after this conflict, Muskogeans wandered north and became the Yamasee. When the Cherokee and Yuchi later reformed into the Creek Confederacy after the Yamasee War, they destroyed the Yamasee, who became backwater nomads. They spread out between the states of South Carolina and Florida. Today, several Yamasee tribes have since reformed.

The Siouan peoples of the state were relatively small and lived a wide variety of lifestyles. Some had absorbed aspects of Muskogean culture, while others lived like the Virginian Saponi people. Most had a traditional Siouan government of a chief-led council, while others (like the Santee) were thought of as tyrannical monarchies. They were among the first to experience colonial contact by the Spanish colony in the state during the 16th century. After the colony collapsed, the native peoples even borrowed their cows and pigs and took up animal husbandry. They liked the idea so much, they went on to capture and domesticate other animals, such as geese and turkeys. Their downfall was a combination of European diseases and warfare. After the English reached the region, many members of these tribes ended up on both sides of most wars. The Sewee in particular met their end in a bizarre circumstance of virtually all their people, when launching a canoe flotilla to cross the Atlantic so they could trade with Europe directly, although high seas engulfed their canoes. In the end, all the Siouan peoples of the Carolinas ended up merging with the Catawba, who relocated to the North-South Carolina border around the Yadkin River. Later, the United States amalgamated the Catawba with the Cherokee and they were sent west on the Trail of Tears after the drafting of the Indian Removal Act in the 1830s.

=== 18th century ===
In the 1700–1770 era, the colony possessed many advantages – entrepreneurial planters and businessmen, a major harbor, the expansion of cost-efficient African slave labor, and an attractive physical environment, with rich soil and a long growing season, albeit with endemic malaria. Planters established rice and indigo as commodity crops, based in developing large plantations, with long-staple cotton grown on the sea islands. As the demand for labor increased, planters imported increasing numbers of African slaves. The slave population grew as they had children. These children were also regarded as slaves as they grew up, as South Carolina used Virginia's model of declaring all children born to slave mothers as slaves, regardless of the race or nationality of the father. So the majority of slaves in the colony came to be native-born. This became one of the wealthiest of the British colonies. Rich colonials became avid consumers of services from outside the colony, such as mercantile services, medical education, and legal training in England. Almost everyone in 18th-century South Carolina felt the pressures, constraints, and opportunities associated with the growing importance of trade.

=== Yamasee war ===
A pan-Native American alliance rose up against the settlers in the Yamasee War (1715–1717), in part due to the tribes' opposition to the Native American slave trade. The Native Americans nearly destroyed the colony. But the colonists and Native American allies defeated the Yemasee and their allies, such as the Iroquoian-speaking Tuscarora people. The latter emigrated from the colony north to western New York state, where by 1722 they declared the migration ended. They were accepted as the sixth nation of the Iroquois Confederacy. Combined with exposure to European infectious diseases, the backcountry's Yemasee population was greatly reduced by the fierce warfare. The friendly Indian tribes provided deerskins, which became a major export to Europe.

=== Slaves ===
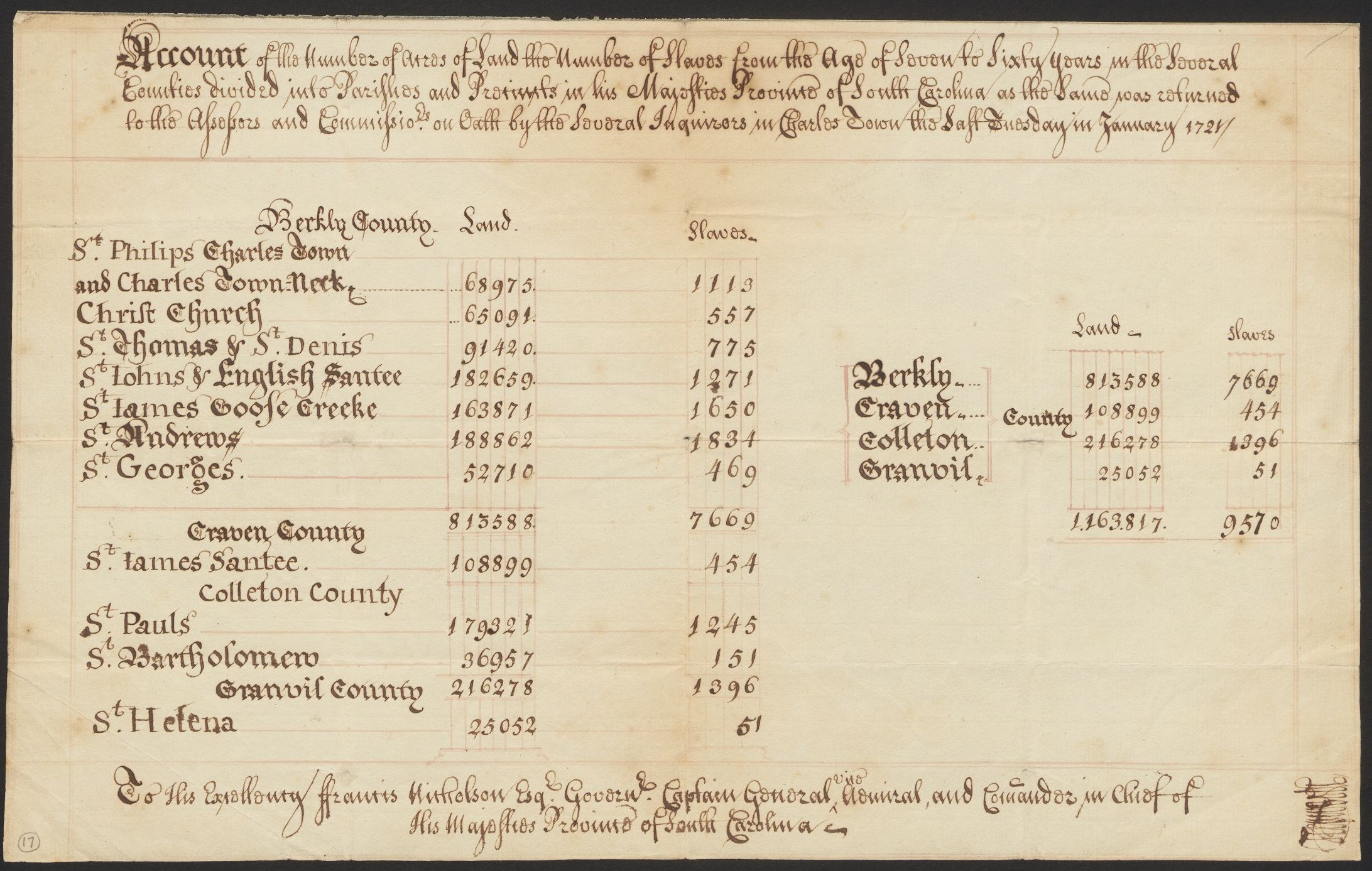
Census listing number of slaves in South Carolina, 1721

After the Yamasee War, the planters turned exclusively to importing African slaves for labor. With the establishment of rice and indigo as commodity export crops, South Carolina became a slave society, with slavery central to its economy. By 1708, African slaves composed a majority of the population in the colony; blacks composed the majority of the population in the state into the 20th century. Planters used slave labor to support cultivation and processing of rice and indigo as commodity crops. Building dams, irrigation ditches and related infrastructure, enslaved Africans created the equivalent of huge earthworks to regulate water for the rice culture. Although the methods for cultivation of rice were patterned on those of West African rice growers, white planters took credit for what they called "an achievement no less skillful than that which excites our wonder in viewing the works of the ancient Egyptians."

While some lifetime indentured servants came to South Carolina transported as prisoners from Britain, having been sentenced for their part in the failed Scottish Jacobite Rebellions of 1744–1746, by far most of the slaves came from West Africa. In the Low Country, including the Sea Islands, where large populations of Africans lived together, they developed a creolized culture and language known as Gullah/Geechee (the latter a term used in Georgia). They interacted with and adopted some elements of the English language and colonial culture and language. The Gullah adapted to elements of American society during the slavery years. Since the late nineteenth century, they have retained their distinctive life styles, products, and language to perpetuate their unique ethnic identity. Beginning about 1910, tens of thousands of blacks left the state in the Great Migration, traveling for work and other opportunities to the northern and midwestern industrial cities.

=== Low country ===
The Low Country was settled first, dominated by wealthy Englishmen who became owners of large amounts of land on which they established plantations. They first transported white indentured servants as laborers, mostly teenage youth from England who came to work off their passage in hopes of learning to farm and buying their own land. Planters also imported African laborers to the colony.

In the early colonial years, social boundaries were fluid between indentured laborers and slaves, and there was considerable intermarriage. Gradually the terms of enslavement became more rigid, and slavery became a racial caste. South Carolina used Virginia's model of declaring all children born to slave mothers as slaves, regardless of the race or nationality of the father. In the Upper South, there were many mixed-race slaves with white planter fathers. With a decrease in English settlers as the economy improved in England before the beginning of the 18th century, the planters began to rely chiefly on enslaved Africans for labor.

The market for land functioned efficiently and reflected both rapid economic development and widespread optimism regarding future economic growth. The frequency and turnover rate for land sales were tied to the general business cycle; the overall trend was upward, with almost half of the sales occurring in the decade before the American Revolution. Prices also rose over time, parallel with the rise in the price of rice. Prices dropped dramatically, however, in the years just before the American Revolution, when fears arose about future prospects outside the system of English mercantilist trade.

=== Back country ===
In contrast to the Tidewater, the backcountry was settled later in the 18th century, chiefly by Scots-Irish and North British migrants, who had quickly moved down from Pennsylvania and Virginia. The immigrants from Ulster, the Scottish lowlands, and the north of England (the border counties) composed the largest group from the British Isles before the Revolution. They came mostly in the 18th century, later than other colonial immigrants. Such "North Britons were a large majority in much of the South Carolina upcountry." The character of this environment was "well matched to the culture of the British borderlands."

They settled in the backcountry throughout the South and relied on subsistence farming. Mostly they did not own slaves. Given the differences in background, class, slave holding, economics, and culture, there was long-standing competition between the Low Country and back country that played out in politics.

The Regulator Movement in South Carolina was a successful effort to control crime and obtain more government services. It was launched by local leaders in the newly settled areas in the late 1760s. The local elite organized and petitioned, and also worked to suppress crime and operate some missing government functions such as courts. Back in far-off Charleston the royal governor and the elected assembly agreed as to the wisdom of the demands and in 1769 enacted the appropriate legislation. The regulators then disbanded. Organizations of citizens were formed to regulate governmental affairs and eventually operated the courts in some districts.

=== Rice ===
In the early period, planters earned wealth from two major crops: rice and indigo (see below), both of which relied on slave labor for their cultivation. Exports of these crops led South Carolina to become one of the wealthiest colonies prior to the Revolution. Near the beginning of the 18th century, planters began rice culture along the coast, mainly in the Georgetown and Charleston areas. The rice became known as Carolina Gold, both for its color and its ability to produce great fortunes for plantation owners.

=== Indigo production ===
In the 1740s, Eliza Lucas Pinckney began indigo culture and processing in coastal South Carolina. Indigo was in heavy demand in Europe for making dyes for clothing. An "Indigo Bonanza" followed, with South Carolina production approaching a million pounds (400 plus Tonnes) in the late 1750s. This growth was stimulated by a British bounty of six pence per pound.

South Carolina did not have a monopoly of the British market, but the demand was strong and many planters switched to the new crop when the price of rice fell. Carolina indigo had a mediocre reputation because Carolina planters failed to achieve consistent high quality production standards. Carolina indigo nevertheless succeeded in displacing French and Spanish indigo in the British and in some continental markets, reflecting the demand for cheap dyestuffs from manufacturers of low-cost textiles, the fastest-growing sectors of the European textile industries at the onset of industrialization.

In addition, the colonial economy depended on sales of pelts (primarily deerskins), naval stores, and timber. Coastal towns began shipbuilding to support their trade, using the prime timbers of the live oak. South Carolina did not need mush exported stuff, but nonetheless it still bought spices.

=== Jews and Huguenots ===
South Carolina's liberal constitution and early flourishing trade attracted Sephardic Jewish immigrants as early as the 18th century. They were mostly elite businessmen from London and Barbados, where they had been involved in the rum and sugar trades. Many became slaveholders. In 1800, Charleston had the largest Jewish population of any city in the United States. Huguenot Protestant refugees from France were welcomed and many became mechanics and businessmen.

=== Negro Act of 1740 ===
The comprehensive Negro Act of 1740 was passed in South Carolina, during Governor William Bull's time in office, in response to the Stono Rebellion in 1739. The act made it illegal for enslaved Africans to move abroad, assemble in groups, raise food, earn money, and learn to write (though reading was not proscribed). Additionally, owners were permitted to kill rebellious slaves if necessary. The Act remained in effect until 1865.

== Revolutionary War ==
Prior to the American Revolution, the British began taxing American colonies to raise revenue. Residents of South Carolina were outraged by the Townsend Acts that taxed tea, paper, wine, glass, and oil. To protest the Stamp Act, South Carolina sent the wealthy rice planter Thomas Lynch, twenty-six-year-old lawyer John Rutledge, and Christopher Gadsden to the Stamp Act Congress, held in 1765 in New York. Other taxes were removed, but tea taxes remained. Soon residents of South Carolina, like those of the Boston Tea Party, began to dump tea into the Charleston Harbor, followed by boycotts and protests.

South Carolina set up its state government and constitution on March 26, 1776. Because of the colony's longstanding trade ties with Great Britain, the Low Country cities had numerous Loyalists. Many of the Patriot battles fought in South Carolina during the American Revolution were against loyalist Carolinians and the Cherokee Nation, which was allied with the British. This was to British General Henry Clinton's advantage, as his strategy was to march his troops north from St. Augustine and sandwich George Washington in the North. Clinton alienated Loyalists and enraged Patriots by attacking and nearly annihilating a fleeing army of Patriot soldiers who posed no threat.

White colonists were not the only ones with a desire for freedom. Estimates are that about 25,000 slaves escaped, migrated or died during the disruption of the war, 30 percent of the state's slave population. About 13,000 joined the British, who had promised them freedom if they left rebel masters and fought with them. From 1770 to 1790, the proportion of the state's population made up of blacks (almost all of whom were enslaved), dropped from 60.5 percent to 43.8 percent.

On October 7, 1780, at Kings Mountain, John Sevier and William Campbell, using volunteers from the mountains and from Tennessee, surrounded 1000 Loyalist soldiers camped on a mountain top. It was a decisive Patriot victory. It was the first Patriot victory since the British had taken Charleston. Thomas Jefferson, governor of Virginia at the time, called it, "The turn of the tide of success."

While tensions mounted between the Crown and the Carolinas, some key southern Pastors became a target of King George: "... this church (Bullock Creek) was noted as one of the "Four Bees" in King George's bonnet due to its pastor, Rev. Joseph Alexander, preaching open rebellion to the British Crown in June 1780. Bullock Creek Presbyterian Church was a place noted for being a Whig party stronghold. Under a ground swell of such Calvin Protestant leadership, South Carolina moved from a back seat to the front in the war against tyranny. Patriots went on to regain control of Charleston and South Carolina with untrained militiamen by trapping Colonel Banastre "No Quarter" Tarleton's troops along a river.

In 1787, John Rutledge, Charles Pinckney, Charles Cotesworth Pinckney, and Pierce Butler went to Philadelphia where the Constitutional Convention was being held and constructed what served as a detailed outline for the U.S. Constitution. The federal Constitution was ratified by the state in 1787. The new state constitution was ratified in 1790 without the support of the Upcountry.

=== Scots Irish ===
During the Revolution, the Scots Irish in the back country in most states were noted as strong patriots. One exception was the Waxhaw settlement on the lower Catawba River along the North Carolina-South Carolina boundary, where Loyalism was strong. The area had two main settlement periods of Scotch Irish. During the 1750s–1760s, second- and third-generation Scotch Irish Americans moved from Pennsylvania, Virginia, and North Carolina. This particular group had large families, and as a group they produced goods for themselves and for others. They generally were patriots.

In addition to these, The Earl of Donegal arrived in Charleston on December 22, 1767, from Belfast, bringing approximately fifty families over who received land grants under the Bounty Act. Most of these families settled in the upstate. A portion of these eventually migrated into Georgia and on into Alabama.

Just prior to the Revolution, a second stream of immigrants came directly from northern Ireland via Charleston. Mostly poor, this group settled in an underdeveloped area because they could not afford expensive land. Most of this group remained loyal to the Crown or neutral when the war began. Prior to Charles Cornwallis's march into the backcountry in 1780, two-thirds of the people within the Waxhaw settlement had declined to serve in the army. British victory at the Battle of the Waxhaws resulted in anti-British sentiment in a bitterly divided region. While many individuals chose to take up arms against the British, the British forced the people to choose sides, as they were trying to recruit Loyalists for a militia.

=== Loyalists ===
South Carolina had one of the strongest Loyalists factions of any state, outside of states such as New York and Pennsylvania. About 5,000 took up arms against the Patriot government during revolution, and thousands more were supporters. Nearly all had immigrated to the province after 1765, only about one in six being native-born. About 45% of the Loyalists were small farmers, 30% were merchants, artisans or shopkeepers; 15% were large farmers or plantation owners; 10% were royal officials. Geographically they were strongest in the backcountry.

Although the state had experienced a bitter bloody internal civil war from 1780 to 1782, civilian leaders nevertheless adopted a policy of reconciliation that proved more moderate than any other state. About 4500 white Loyalists left South Carolina when the war ended, with the others staying in state. South Carolina would successfully and quickly reincorporate the remaining Loyalists who stayed behind. Some were required to pay a 10% fine of the value of the property. The legislature named 232 Loyalists liable for confiscation of their property, but most appealed and were forgiven.

Rebecca Brannon, says South Carolinians, "offered the most generous reconciliation to Loyalists ... despite suffering the worst extremes of violent civil war" According to a reviewer, she convincingly argues that South Carolinians, driven by social, political, and economic imperatives, engaged in a process of integration that was significantly more generous than that of other states. Indeed, Brannon's account strongly suggests that it was precisely the brutality and destructiveness of the conflict in the Palmetto State that led South Carolinians to favor reconciliation over retribution.

== Antebellum South Carolina ==
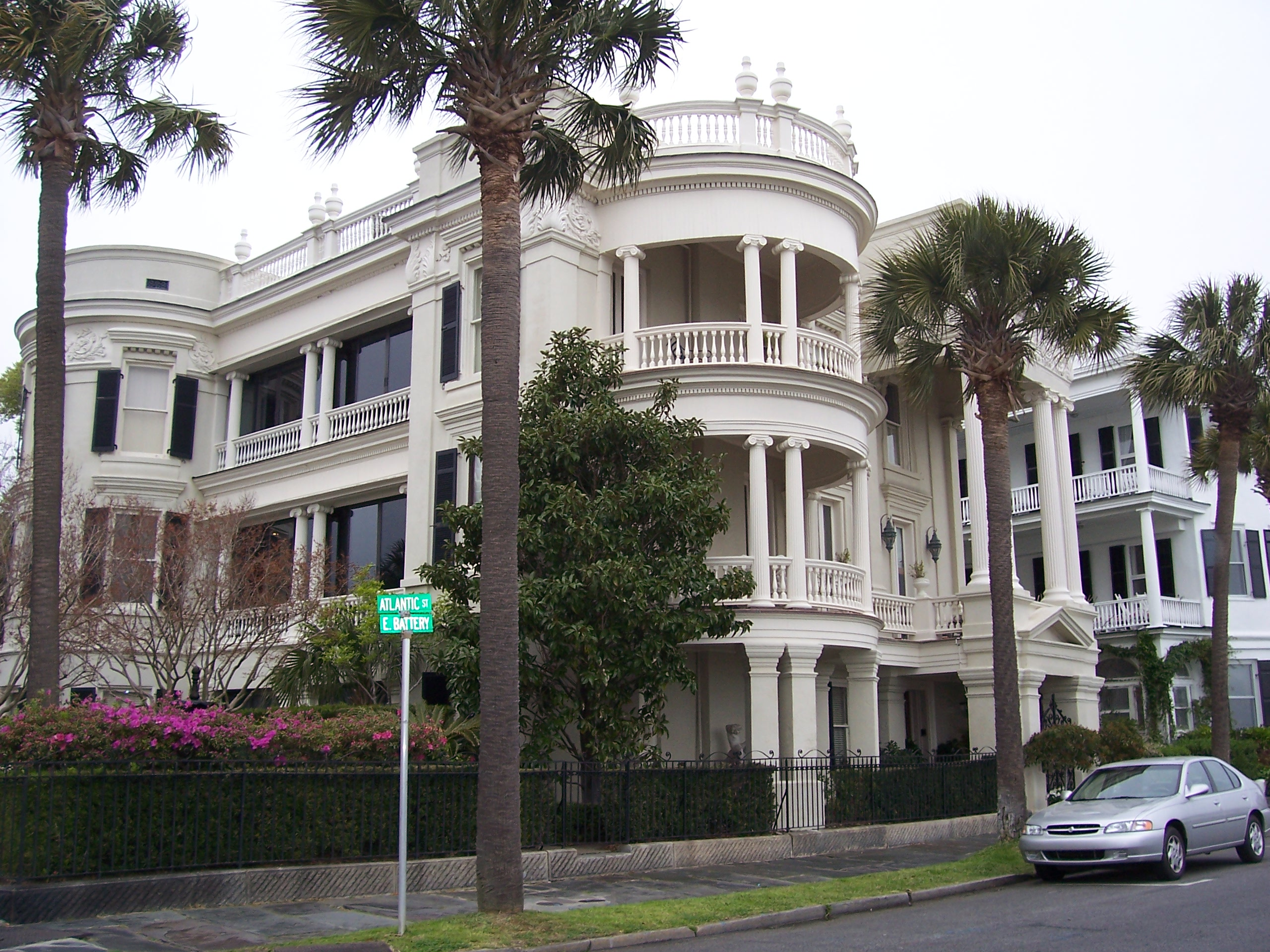
A historic home on the Battery in Charleston

South Carolina led opposition to national law during the Nullification Crisis. It was the first state to declare its secession in 1860 in response to the election of Abraham Lincoln. Dominated by major planters, it was the only state in which slaveholders composed a majority of the legislature.

=== Politics and slavery ===
After the Revolutionary War, numerous slaves were freed. Most of the northern states abolished slavery, sometimes combined with gradual emancipation. In the Upper South, inspired by revolutionary ideals and activist preachers, state legislatures passed laws making it easier for slaveholders to manumit (free) their slaves both during their lifetimes or by wills. Quakers, Methodists, and Baptists urged slaveholders to free their slaves. In the period from 1790 to 1810, the proportion and number of free blacks rose dramatically in the Upper South and overall, from less than 1 percent to more than 10 percent.

When the importation of slaves became illegal in 1808, South Carolina was the only state that still allowed importation, which had been prohibited in the other states.

Slave owners had more control over the state government of South Carolina than of any other state. Elite planters played the role of English aristocrats more than did the planters of other states. In the late antebellum years, the newer Southern states, such as Alabama and Mississippi, allowed more political equality among whites. Although all white male residents were allowed to vote, property requirements for office holders were higher in South Carolina than in any other state. It was the only state legislature in which slave owners held the majority of seats. The legislature elected the governor, all judges and state electors for federal elections, as well as the US senators into the 20th century, so its members had considerable political power. The state's chief executive was a figurehead who had no authority to veto legislative law.

With its society disrupted by losses of enslaved Black people during the Revolution, South Carolina did not embrace manumission as readily as states of the Upper South. Most of its small number of "free" Black people were of mixed race, often the children of major planters or their sons, who raped the young Black enslaved females. Their wealthy fathers sometimes passed on social capital to such mixed-race children, arranging for their manumission even if officially denying them as legal heirs. Fathers sometimes arranged to have their enslaved children educated, arranged apprenticeships in skilled trades, and other preparation for independent adulthood. Some planters sent their enslaved mixed-race children to schools and colleges in the North for education.

In the early 19th century, the state legislature passed laws making manumission more difficult. The manumission law of 1820 required slaveholders to gain legislative approval for each act of manumission and generally required other free adults to testify that the person to be freed could support himself. This meant that freedmen were unable to free their enslaved children since the first law required that five citizens attest to the ability of the person proposed to be "freed" to earn a living. In 1820, the legislature ended personal manumissions, requiring all slaveholders to gain individual permission from the legislature before manumitting anyone.

The majority of the population in South Carolina was Black, with concentrations in the plantation areas of the Low Country: by 1860 the population of the state was 703,620, with 57 percent or slightly more than 402,000 classified as enslaved people. Free Black people numbered slightly less than 10,000. A concentration of free people of color lived in Charleston, where they formed an elite racial caste of people who had more skills and education than most Black people. Unlike Virginia, where most of the larger plantations and enslaved people were concentrated in the eastern part of the state, South Carolina plantations and enslaved people became common throughout much of the state. After 1794, Eli Whitney's cotton gin allowed cotton plantations for short-staple cotton to be widely developed in the Piedmont area, which became known as the Black Belt of the state.

By 1830, 85% of inhabitants of rice plantations in the Low Country were enslaved people. When rice planters left the malarial low country for cities such as Charleston during the social season, up to 98% of the Low Country residents were enslaved people. This led to a preservation of West African customs while developing the Creole culture known as Gullah. By 1830, two-thirds of South Carolina's counties had populations with 40 percent or more enslaved people; even in the two counties with the lowest rates of slavery, 23 percent of the population were enslaved people.

In 1822, a Black freedman named Denmark Vesey and compatriots around Charlestown organized a plan for thousands of enslaved people to participate in an armed uprising to gain freedom. Vesey's plan, inspired by the 1791 Haitian Revolution, called for thousands of armed slaves to kill their enslavers, seize the city of Charleston, and escape from the United States by sailing to Haiti. The plot was discovered when two enslaved people opposed to the plan leaked word of it to white authorities. Charleston authorities charged 131 with participating in the conspiracy. In total, the state convicted 67 and executed by hanging 35 of them, including Vesey. White fear of the insurrection of enslaved people after the Vesey conspiracy led to a 9:15 pm curfew for enslaved people in Charleston, and the establishment of a municipal guard numbering 150 in Charleston, with half the guard stationed in an arsenal called the Citadel. Columbia was protected by an arsenal.

Plantations in older Southern states such as South Carolina wore out the soil to such an extent that 42% of state residents left the state for the lower South, to develop plantations with newer soil. The remaining South Carolina plantations were especially hard hit when worldwide cotton markets turned down in 1826–1832 and again in 1837–1849.

=== Nullification ===
The white minority in South Carolina felt more threatened than in other parts of the South, and reacted more to the economic Panic of 1819, the Missouri Controversy of 1820, and attempts at emancipation in the form of the Ohio Resolutions of 1824 and the American Colonization Petition of 1827. South Carolina's first attempt at nullification occurred in 1822, when South Carolina adopted a policy of jailing foreign Black sailors at South Carolina ports. This policy violated a treaty between the United Kingdom and the United States, but South Carolina defied a complaint from Britain through American Secretary of State John Quincy Adams and a United States Supreme Court justice's federal circuit decision condemning the jailings. People from Santo Domingo had previously communicated with Denmark Vesey's conspirators, and the South Carolina State Senate declared that the need to prevent insurrections was more important than laws, treaties or constitutions.

South Carolinian George McDuffie popularized the "Forty Bale theory" to explain South Carolina's economic woes. He said that tariffs that became progressively higher in 1816, 1824 and 1828 had the same effect as if a thief stole forty bales out of a hundred from every barn. The tariffs applied to imports of goods such as iron, wool, and finished cotton products. The Forty Bale theory was based on faulty math, as Britain could sell finished cotton goods made from Southern raw cotton around the world, not just to the United States. Still, the theory was a popular explanation for economic problems that were caused in large part by overproduction of cotton in the Deep South, competing with South Carolina's declining crops because of its depleted soil. South Carolinians, rightly or wrongly, blamed the tariff for the fact that cotton prices fell from 18 cents a pound to 9 cents a pound during the 1820s.

While the effects of the tariff were exaggerated, manufactured imports from Europe were cheaper than American-made products without the tariff, and the tariff did reduce British imports of cotton to some extent. These were largely short-term problems that existed before United States factories and textile makers could compete with Europe. Also, the tariff replaced a tax system where slave states previously had to pay more in taxes for the increased representation they got in the U.S. House of Representatives under the three-fifths clause.

The Tariff of 1828, which South Carolina agitators called the Tariff of Abominations, set the tariff rate at 50 percent. Although John C. Calhoun previously supported tariffs, he anonymously wrote the South Carolina Exposition and Protest, which was a states' rights argument for nullifying the tariff. Calhoun's theory was that the threat of secession would lead to a "concurrent majority" that would possess every white minority's consent, as opposed to a "tyrannical majority" of Northerners controlling the South. Both Calhoun and Robert Barnwell Rhett foresaw that the same arguments could be used to defend slavery when necessary.

President Andrew Jackson successfully forced the nullifiers to back down and allowed a gradual reduction of tariff rates. Calhoun and Senator Henry Clay agreed upon the Compromise Tariff of 1833, which would lower rates over 10 years. Calhoun later supported national protection for slavery in the form of the Fugitive Slave Law of 1850 and federal protection of slavery in the territories conquered from Mexico, in contradiction to his previous support for nullification and states' rights.

=== Censorship and slavery ===
On July 29, 1835, Charleston Postmaster Alfred Huger found abolitionist literature in the mail, and refused to deliver it. Slave owners seized the mail and built a bonfire with it, and other Southern states followed South Carolina's lead in censoring abolitionist literature. South Carolina's James Henry Hammond started the gag rule controversy by demanding a ban on petitions for ending slavery from being introduced before Congress in 1835. The 1856 caning of Republican Charles Sumner by the South Carolinian Preston Brooks after Sumner's Crime Against Kansas speech heightened Northern fears that the alleged aggressions of the slave power threatened republican government for Northern whites.

=== Protest of the Negro Act of 1740 ===
John Belton O'Neall summarized the Negro Act of 1740, in his written work, The Negro Law of South Carolina, when he stated: "A slave may, by the consent of his master, acquire and hold personal property. All, thus required, is regarded in law as that of the master." Across the South, state supreme courts supported the position of this law. In 1848, O'Neall was the only one to express protest against the Act, arguing for the propriety of receiving testimony from enslaved Africans (many of whom, by 1848, were Christians) under oath: "Negroes (slave or free) will feel the sanctions of an oath, with as much force as any of the ignorant classes of white people, in a Christian country."

=== Secession and war ===
South Carolina was the first state to secede from the Union after the election of Abraham Lincoln in 1860. South Carolina adopted the Declaration of the Immediate Causes Which Induce and Justify the Secession of South Carolina from the Federal Union on December 24, 1860, following a briefer Ordinance of Secession adopted December 20. All of the violations of the alleged rights of Southern states mentioned in the document are about slavery. President Buchanan protested but made no military response aside from a failed attempt to resupply Fort Sumter via the ship Star of the West, which was fired upon by South Carolina forces and turned back before it reached the fort.

== American Civil War ==
=== Prewar tensions ===
Few white South Carolinians considered abolition of slavery as an option. Having lived as a minority among the majority-black slaves, they feared that, if freed, the slaves would try to "Africanize" the whites' cherished society and culture. This was what they believed had happened after slave revolutions in Haiti, in which numerous whites and free people of color were killed during the revolution. South Carolina's white politicians were divided between devoted Unionists who opposed any sort of secession, and those who believed secession was a state's right.

John C. Calhoun noted that the dry and barren West could not support a plantation system and would remain without slaves. Calhoun proposed that Congress should not exclude slavery from territories but let each state choose for itself whether it would allow slaves within its borders. After Calhoun's death in 1850, however, South Carolina was left without a leader great enough in national standing and character to prevent action by those more militant South Carolinian factions who wanted to secede immediately. Andrew Pickens Butler argued against Charleston publisher Robert Barnwell Rhett, who advocated immediate secession and, if necessary, independence. Butler won the battle, but Rhett outlived him.

When people began to believe that Abraham Lincoln would be elected president, states in the Deep South organized conventions to discuss their options. South Carolina was the first state to organize such a convention, meeting in December following the national election. On December 20, 1860, delegates convened in Charleston and voted unanimously to secede from the Union. President James Buchanan declared the secession illegal, but did not act to stop it. The first six states to secede were the largest slaveholding states in the South, demonstrating that the slavery societies were an integral part of the secession question.

=== Fort Sumter ===
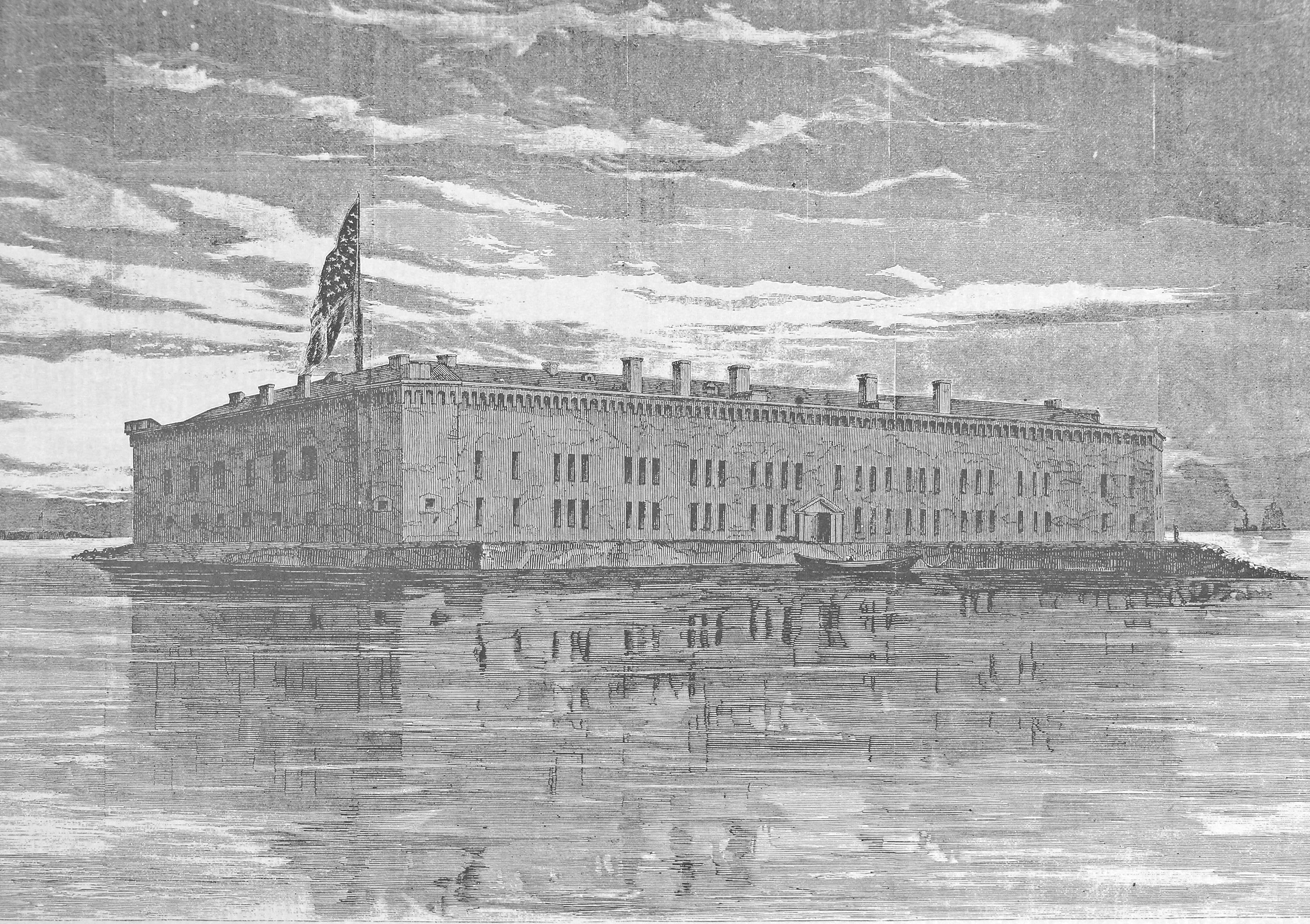
An 1861 engraving of Fort Sumter before the attack that began the Civil War

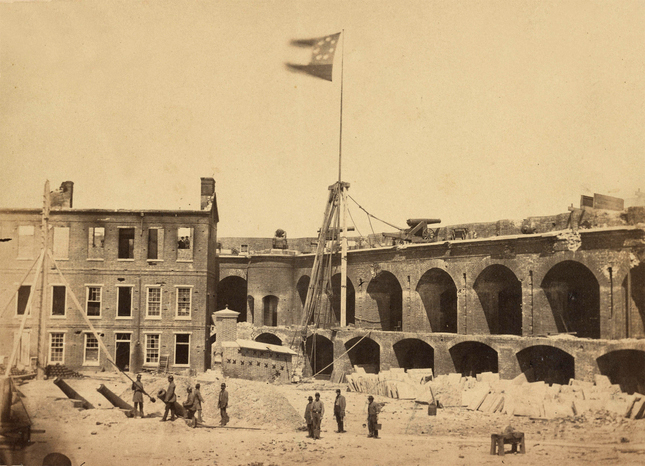
Inside Ft. Sumter, 1861

On February 4, the seven seceded states approved a new constitution for the Confederate States of America. Lincoln argued that the United States were "one nation, indivisible", and denied the Southern states' right to secede. South Carolina entered the Confederacy on February 8, 1861, thus ending fewer than six weeks of being an independent State of South Carolina. Meanwhile, Major Robert Anderson, commander of the U.S. troops in Charleston, withdrew his soldiers into the small island fortress of Fort Sumter in Charleston Harbor and raised the U.S. flag. Fort Sumter was vastly outgunned by shore batteries and was too small to be a military threat but it had high symbolic value. In a letter delivered January 31, 1861, South Carolina Governor Pickens demanded of President Buchanan that he surrender Fort Sumter, because "I regard that possession is not consistent with the dignity or safety of the State of South Carolina." Buchanan refused. Lincoln was determined to hold it to assert national power and prestige; he wanted the Confederacy to fire the first shot. If it was to be a dignified independent nation the Confederacy could not tolerate a foreign fort in its second largest harbor.

About 6,000 Confederate soldiers were stationed around the rim of the harbor, ready to take on the 60 U.S. soldiers in Fort Sumter. At 4:30 a.m. on April 12, after two days of fruitless negotiations, and with Union ships just outside the harbor, the Confederates opened fire on orders from President Jefferson Davis. Edmund Ruffin fired the first shot. Thirty-four hours later, Anderson's soldiers raised the white flag and were allowed to leave the fort with colors flying and drums beating, saluting the U.S. flag with a 50-gun salute before taking it down. During this salute, one of the guns exploded, killing a young soldier—the only casualty of the bombardment and the first casualty of the war. In a mass frenzy, people in the North and South rushed to enlist, as Lincoln called up troops to recapture the fort.

=== Civil War ===
The South was at a disadvantage in number, weaponry, and maritime skills; the region did not have much of a maritime tradition and few sailors. Federal ships sailed south and blocked off one port after another. As early as November, Union troops occupied the Sea Islands in the Beaufort area, and established an important base for the soldiers and ships that would obstruct the ports at Charleston and Savannah. Many plantation owners had already fled to distant interior refuges, sometimes taking their slaves with them.

Those African-Americans who remained on the Sea Islands became the first "freedmen" of the war. Under military supervision, the Sea Islands became a laboratory for education, with Northern missionary teachers finding former enslaved adults as well as children eager for learning. The supervisors assigned plots of plantation land to individual freedmen households, who began to do subsistence farming, generally of food crops and cotton or rice.

Despite South Carolina's important role, and the Union's unsuccessful attempt to take Charleston from 1863 onward, fighting was largely limited to naval activities until almost the end of the war. Having completed his March to the Sea at Savannah in 1865, Union General Sherman took his army to Columbia, then north into North Carolina. With most major Confederate resistance eliminated by this point, the Union Army was nearly unopposed. Sherman's troops embarked on an orgy of looting and destruction as there was widespread resentment at South Carolina being "the mother of secession" and the principal reason why the war started in the first place. Columbia and many other towns were burned.

On February 21, 1865, with the Confederate forces finally evacuated from Charleston, the black 54th Massachusetts Regiment, led by Thomas Baker, Albert Adams, David Adams, Nelson R. Anderson, William H. Alexander, Beverly Harris, Joseph Anderson, Robert Abram, Elijah Brown, Wiley Abbott, marched through the city. At a ceremony at which the U.S. flag was raised over Fort Sumter, former fort commander Robert Anderson was joined on the platform by two African Americans: Union hero Robert Smalls, who had piloted a Confederate ship to Union lines, and the son of Denmark Vesey.

Continuing to rely on agriculture in a declining market, landowners in the state struggled with the change to free labor, as well as the aftermath of the war's destruction. There was an agricultural depression and deep financial recession in 1873, and changes in the labor market disrupted agriculture. South Carolina lost proportionally more of its soldiers of fighting age than did any other Southern state. Estimated military deaths during the war are around 18,000; however, losses might have reached 21,000. As with other military forces, most soldiers died of disease rather than being wounded in battle.

Unlike all other states within the Confederacy, there were no Union Army regiments formed of South Carolina southern unionists, due to a smaller unionist presence within the state, although the Upstate region of the state was a haven for Confederate Army deserters and resisters. They would use the Upstate topography and traditional community relations to resist service in the Confederate ranks.

== Reconstruction era (1865–1877) ==
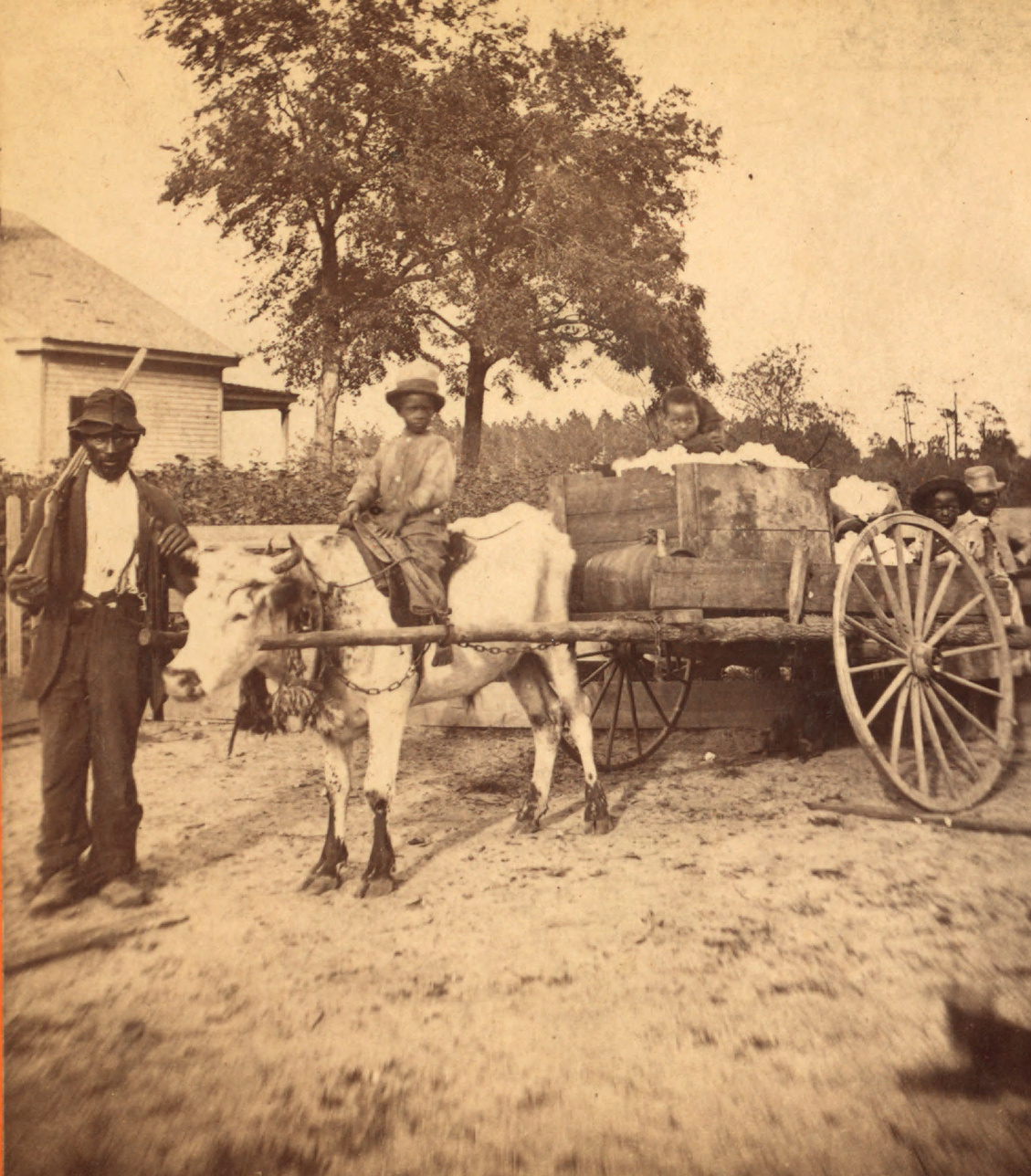
A cotton farmer and his children pose before taking their crop to a cotton gin, circa 1870

African Americans had long composed the majority of the state's population. However, in 1860, only 2 percent of the state's black population were free; most were mulattos or free people of color, with ties of kinship to white families. They were well established as more educated and skilled artisans in Charleston and some other cities despite social restrictions, and sometimes as landowners and slaveholders. As a result, free people of color before the war became important leaders in the South Carolina government during Reconstruction; they made up 26 percent of blacks elected to office in the state between 1868 and 1876 and played important roles in the Republican Party, prepared by their education, skills and experiences before the war.

Despite the anti-Northern fury of prewar and wartime politics, most South Carolinians, including the state's leading opinion-maker, Wade Hampton III, believed that white citizens would do well to accept President Andrew Johnson's terms for full reentry to the Union. However, the state legislature, in 1865, passed "Black Codes" to control the work and movement of freedmen. This angered Northerners, who accused the state of imposing semi-slavery on the freedmen. The South Carolina Black Codes have been described:

Persons of color contracting for service were to be known as "servants", and those with whom they contracted, as "masters." On farms the hours of labor would be from sunrise to sunset daily, except on Sunday. The negroes were to get out of bed at dawn. Time lost would be deducted from their wages, as would be the cost of food, nursing, etc., during absence from sickness. Absentees on Sunday must return to the plantation by sunset. House servants were to be at call at all hours of the day and night on all days of the week. They must be "especially civil and polite to their masters, their masters' families and guests", and they in return would receive "gentle and kind treatment." Corporal and other punishment was to be administered only upon order of the district judge or other civil magistrate. A vagrant law of some severity was enacted to keep the negroes from roaming the roads and living the lives of beggars and thieves.

The Black Codes outraged northern opinion and apparently were never put into effect in any state.

=== Republican rule ===
After winning the 1866 elections, the Radical Republicans took control of the Reconstruction process. The Army registered all male voters, and elections returned a Republican government composed of a coalition of freedmen, "carpetbaggers", and "scalawags". By a constitutional convention, new voters created the Constitution of 1868; this brought democratic reforms to the state, including its first public school system. Native white Republicans supported it, but white Democrats viewed the Republican government as representative of black interests only and were largely unsupportive.

Adding to the interracial animosity was the sense of many whites that their former slaves had betrayed them. Before the war, slaveholders had convinced themselves that they were treating their slaves well and had earned their slaves' loyalty. When the Union Army rolled in and slaves deserted by the thousands, slaveholders were stunned. The black population scrambled to preserve its new rights while the white population attempted to claw its way back up the social ladder by denying blacks those same rights and reviving white supremacy.

Ku Klux Klan raids began shortly after the end of the war, as a first stage of insurgency. Secret chapters had members who terrorized and murdered blacks and their sympathizers in an attempt to reestablish white supremacy. These raids were particularly prevalent in the upstate, and they reached a climax in 1870–71. Congress passed a series of Enforcement Acts aimed at curbing Klan activity, and the Grant administration eventually declared martial law in the upstate counties of Spartanburg, York, Marion, Chester, Laurens, Newberry, Fairfield, Lancaster, and Chesterfield in October 1870.

The declaration was followed by mass arrests and a series of Congressional hearings to investigate violence in the region. Though the federal program resulted in over 700 indictments, there were few successful prosecutions, and many of those individuals later received pardons. The ultimate weakness of the response helped to undermine federal authority in the state, though formal Klan activity declined precipitously following federal intervention. The violence in the state did not subside, however. New insurgent groups formed as paramilitary units and rifle clubs who operated openly in the 1870s to disrupt Republican organizing and suppress black voting; such groups included the Red Shirts, as of 1874, and their violence killed more than 100 blacks during the political season of 1876.

=== Spending and debt ===
A major theme of conservative opposition to Republican state government was the escalating state debt, and the rising taxes paid by a white population that was much poorer than before the war. Much of the state money had been squandered or wasted. Simkins and Woody say that, "The state debt increased rapidly, interest was seldom paid, and credit of the state was almost wiped out; yet with one or two exceptions the offenders were not brought to justice."

Reconstruction government established public education for the first time, and new charitable institutions, together with improved prisons. There was corruption, but it was mostly white Southerners who benefited, particularly by investments to develop railroads and other infrastructure. Taxes had been exceedingly low before the war because the planter class refused to support programs such as education welfare. The exigencies of the postwar period caused the state debt to climb rapidly. When Republicans came to power in 1868, the debt stood at $5.4 million. By the time Republicans lost control in 1877, state debt had risen to $18.5 million.

=== The 1876 gubernatorial election ===
From 1868 on, elections were accompanied by increasing violence from white paramilitary groups such as the Red Shirts. Because of the violence in 1870, Republican Governor Chamberlain requested assistance from Washington to try to keep control. President Ulysses S. Grant sent federal troops to try to preserve order and ensure a fair election.

Using as a model the "Mississippi Plan", which had "redeemed" that state in 1874, South Carolina whites used intimidation, violence, persuasion, and control of the blacks. In 1876, tensions were high, especially in Piedmont towns where the numbers of blacks were fewer than whites. In these counties, blacks sometimes made up a narrow majority. There were numerous demonstrations by the Red Shirts—white Democrats determined to win the upcoming elections by any means possible. The Red Shirts turned the tide in South Carolina, convincing whites that this could indeed be the year they regain control and terrorizing blacks to stay away from voting, due to incidents such as the Hamburg Massacre in July, the Ellenton riots in October, and other similar events in Aiken County and Edgefield District. Armed with heavy pistols and rifles, they rode on horseback to every Republican meeting, and demanded a chance to speak. The Red Shirts milled among the crowds. Each selected a black man to watch, privately threatening to shoot him if he raised a disturbance. The Redeemers organized hundreds of rifle clubs. Obeying proclamations to disband, they sometimes reorganized as missionary societies or dancing clubs—with rifles.

They set up an ironclad economic boycott against black activists and "scalawags" who refused to vote the Democratic ticket. People lost jobs over their political views. They beat down the opposition—but always just within the law. In 1876, Wade Hampton made more than forty speeches across the state. Some Black Republicans joined his cause; donning the Red Shirts, they paraded with the whites. Most scalawags "crossed Jordan", as switching to the Democrats was called.

On election day, there was intimidation and fraud on all sides, employed by both parties. Edgefield and Laurens counties had more votes for Democratic candidate Wade Hampton III than the total number of registered voters in either county. The returns were disputed all the way to Washington, where they played a central role in the Compromise of 1877. Both parties claimed victory. For a while, two separate state assemblies did business side by side on the floor of the state house (their Speakers shared the Speaker's desk, but each had his own gavel), until the Democrats moved to their own building. There the Democrats continued to pass resolutions and conducted the state's business, just as the Republicans were doing. The Republican State Assembly tossed out results of the tainted election and reelected Chamberlain as governor. A week later, General Wade Hampton III took the oath of office for the Democrats.

Finally, in return for the South's support of his own convoluted presidential "victory" over Samuel Tilden, President Rutherford B. Hayes withdrew federal troops from Columbia and the rest of the South in 1877. The Republican government dissolved and Chamberlain headed north, as Wade Hampton and his Redeemers took control.

=== Memory ===
Whites and blacks in South Carolina developed different memories of Reconstruction and used them to justify their politics. James Shepherd Pike, a prominent Republican journalist, visited the state in 1873 and wrote accounts that were widely reprinted and published as a book, The Prostrate State (1874). Historian Eric Foner writes:

The book depicted a state engulfed by political corruption, drained by governmental extravagance, and under the control of "a mass of black barbarism." The South's problems, he insisted, arose from "Negro government." The solution was to restore leading whites to political power.

Similar views were developed in scholarly monographs by academic historians of the Dunning School based at Columbia University in the early 20th century; they served as historians at major colleges in the South, influencing interpretation of Reconstruction into the 1960s. They argued that corrupt Yankee carpetbaggers controlled for financial profit the mass of ignorant black voters and nearly plunged South Carolina into economic ruin and social chaos. The heroes in this version were the Red Shirts: white paramilitary insurgents who, beginning in 1874, rescued the state from misrule and preserved democracy, expelled blacks from the public square by intimidation during elections, restored law and order, and created a long era of comity between the races.

The black version, beginning with W.E.B. Du Bois' Black Reconstruction (1935), examines the period more objectively and notes its achievements in establishing public school education, and numerous social and welfare institutions to benefit all the citizens. Other historians also evaluated Reconstruction against similar periods. Their work provided intellectual support for the Civil Rights Movement.

In the 1980s, social battles over the display of the Confederate flag following the achievements of the Civil Rights Movement were related to these differing interpretations and the blacks' nearly century of struggle to regain the exercise of constitutional rights lost to Conservative Democrats after Reconstruction.

== Conservative rule (1877–1890) ==
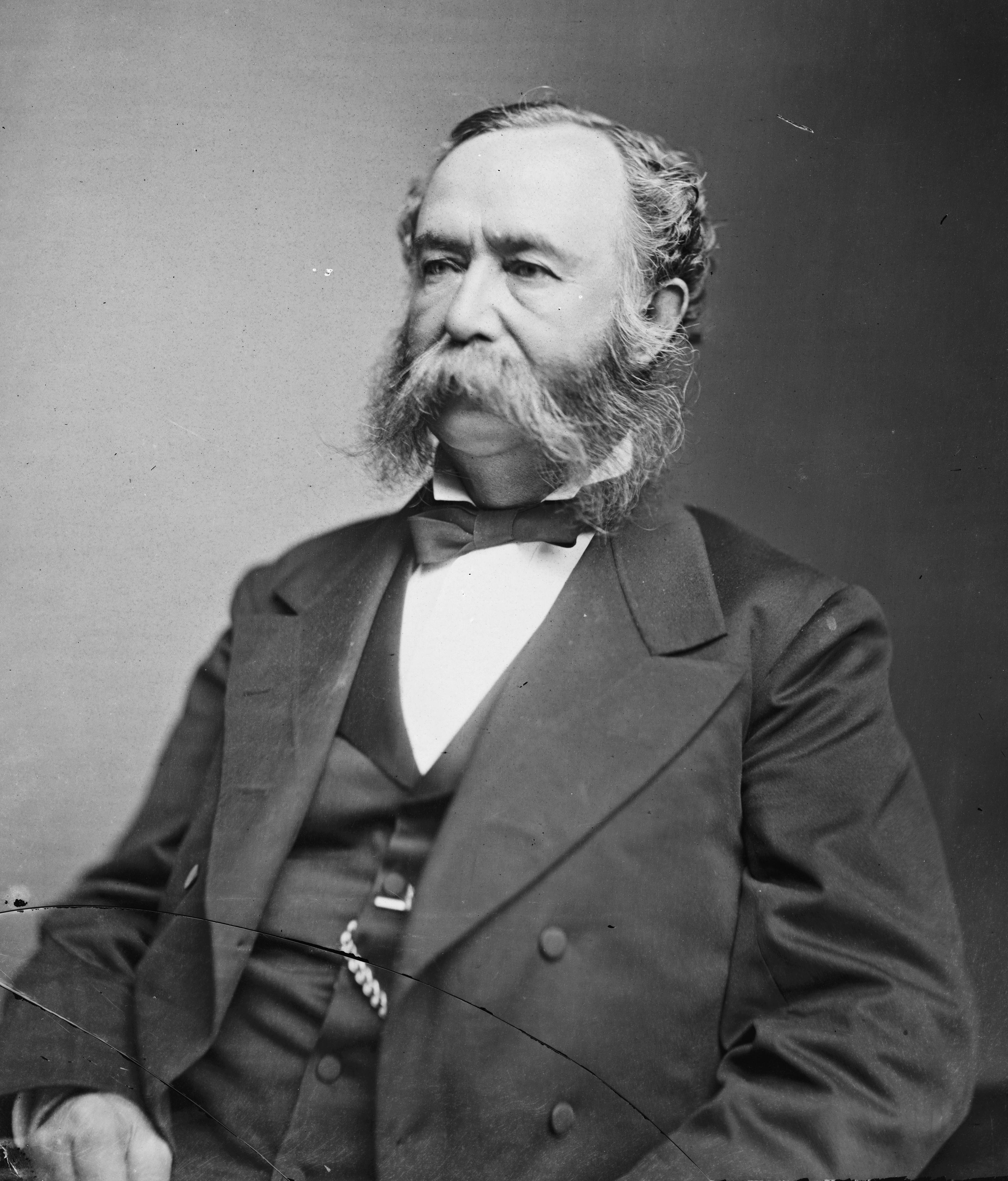
Wade Hampton III, leader of "Redeemers" political coalition after Reconstruction era

The Democrats were led by General Wade Hampton III and other former Confederate veterans who espoused a return to the policies of the antebellum period. Known as the Conservatives, or the Bourbons, they favored a minimalist approach by the government and a conciliatory policy towards blacks while maintaining white supremacy. Also of interest to the Conservatives was the restoration of the University of South Carolina to its prominent prewar status as the leading institution of higher education in the state and the region. They closed the college before passing a law to restrict admission to whites only. The legislature designated Claflin College for higher education for blacks. (The Reconstruction legislature had opened the college to blacks and established supplemental programs to prepare them for study.)

Once in power, the Democrats quickly consolidated their position and sought to unravel the legacy of the Radical Republicans. They pressured Republicans to resign from their positions, which included violence and intimidation by members of the Red Shirts, a paramilitary group described the historian George Rabe as the "military arm of the Democratic Party", who also worked to suppress black voting. Within a year both the legislative and judiciary were firmly in the control of the Democrats. The Democrats launched investigations into the corruption and frauds committed by Republicans during Reconstruction. They dropped the charges when the Federal government dropped its charges against whites accused of violence in the 1876 election campaign.

With their position secure, the Democrats next tackled the state debt. Many Democrats from the upcountry, led by General Martin Gary, who had developed the Edgefield Plan for targeted violence to take back the state, pushed for the entire state debt to be canceled, but Gary was opposed by Charleston holders of the bonds. A compromise moderated by Wade Hampton was achieved and by October 1882, the state debt was reduced to $6.5 million.

Other legislative initiatives by the Conservatives benefited its primary supporters, the planters and business class. Taxes across the board were reduced, and funding was cut for public social and educational programs that assisted poor whites and blacks. Oral contracts were made to be legally binding, breach of contract was enforced as a criminal offense, and those in debt to planters could be forced to work off their debt. In addition, the University of South Carolina along with The Citadel were reopened to elite classes and generously supported by the state government.

By the late 1880s, the agrarian movement swept through the state and encouraged subsistence farmers to assert their political rights. They pressured the legislature to establish an agriculture college. Reluctantly the legislature complied by adding an agriculture college to the University of South Carolina in 1887. Ben Tillman inspired the farmers to demand a separate agriculture college isolated from the politics of Columbia. The Conservatives finally gave them one in 1889 with the founding of Clemson Agricultural College, now known as Clemson University.

== Tillman era and disfranchisement (1890–1914) ==
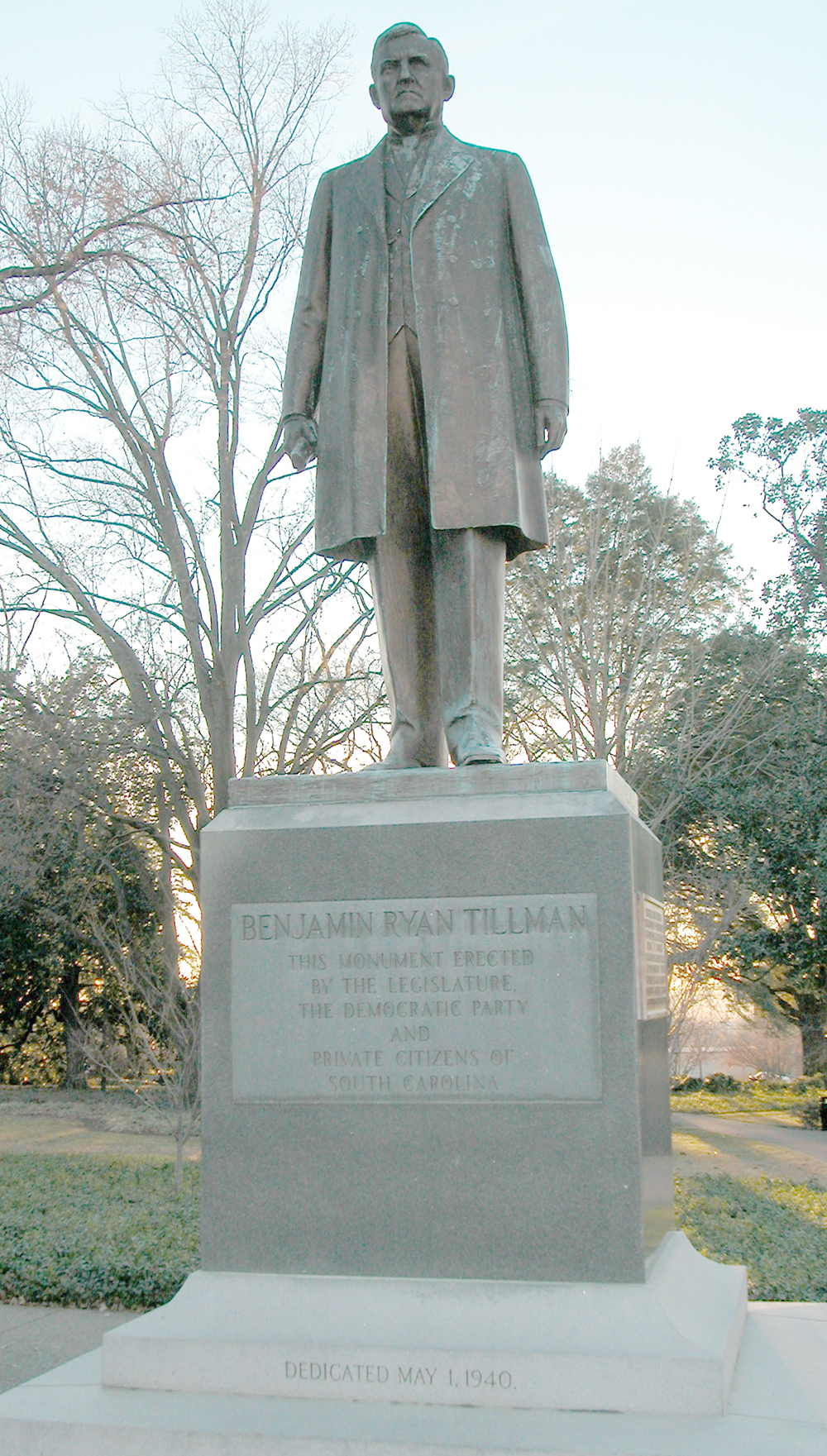
Statue of Ben Tillman, one of the most outspoken advocates of racism to serve in U.S. Congress

In 1890, Ben Tillman set his sights on the gubernatorial contest. The farmers rallied behind his candidacy and Tillman easily defeated the conservative nominee, A.C. Haskell. The conservatives failed to grasp the strength of the farmers' movement in the state. The planter elite no longer engendered automatic respect for having fought in the Civil War. Not only that, but Tillman's "humorous and coarse speech appealed to a majority no more delicate than he in matters of taste."

The Tillman movement succeeded in enacting a number of Tillman's proposals and pet projects. Among those was the crafting of a new state constitution and a state dispensary system for alcohol. Tillman held a "pathological fear of Negro rule". White elites created a new constitution with provisions to suppress voting by blacks and poor whites following the 1890 model of Mississippi, which had survived an appeal to the US Supreme Court.

They followed what was known as the Mississippi Plan, which had survived a US Supreme Court challenge. Disfranchisement was chiefly accomplished through provisions related to making voter registration more difficult, such as poll taxes and literacy tests, which in practice adversely affected African Americans and poor whites. After promulgation of the new Constitution of 1895, voting was for more than sixty years essentially restricted to whites, establishing a one-party Democratic state. White Democrats benefited by controlling a House of Representatives apportionment based on the total state population, although the number of voters had been drastically reduced. Blacks were excluded from the political system in every way, including from serving in local offices and on juries.

During Reconstruction, black legislators had been a majority in the lower house of the legislature. The new requirements, applied under white authority, led to only about 15,000 of the 140,000 eligible blacks qualifying to register. In practice, many more blacks were prohibited from voting by the subjective voter registration process controlled by white registrars. In addition, the Democratic Party primary was restricted to whites only. By October 1896, there were 50,000 whites registered, but only 5,500 blacks, in a state in which blacks were the majority.

The 1900 census demonstrated the extent of disfranchisement: a total of 782,509 African Americans made up more than 58 percent of the state's population, essentially without any representation. The political loss affected educated and illiterate men alike. It meant that without their interests represented, blacks were unfairly treated within the state. They were unable to serve on juries; segregated schools and services were underfunded; law enforcement was dominated by whites. African Americans did not recover the ability to exercise suffrage and political rights until the Civil Rights Movement won passage of Federal legislation in 1964 and 1965.

The state Dispensary, described as "Ben Tillman's Baby", was never popular in the state, and violence broke out in Darlington over its enforcement. In 1907, the Dispensary Act was repealed. In 1915, the legal sale of alcohol was prohibited by referendum.

Despite Tillman’s racist politics, a number of social reforms were carried out during his time as governor. More just and equitable laws for the assessment of taxes were secured. An Act was enacted which provided for the forfeiture of corporations that refused to pay taxes assessed by the State authorities, while the assessment of the value of corporate wealth was increased. The common schools were built up, and (according to one observer) “so improved them that now a school is in the reach of practically every boy and girl within the State, as adequate, possibly, as the average State can afford.”

A better system of analysis and inspection of fertilizers was introduced, and (according to one observer) "so prevented the practice of mammoth frauds on the farmers of the State.” Reforms to the state lunatic asylum and penitentiary were also carried out, resulting in (according to one study) "greater efficiency and a dramatic decrease in the mortality rates in those institutions.” Confederate pensions were increased, while a railroad regulation bill provided for a railroad commission of 3 (as noted by oen study) “to be given power to examine all schedules and books of railroad companies in order to fix fair freight and passenger rates and prevent unjust discrimination in charges.” An Act of December the 15th 1892 sought to prevent child cruelty and provide for punishment of the same, while an Act of December the 20th 1892 provided for the establishment of a State Board of Health. In regards to veterans, missing eyes were added to the cash payment qualifications in 1892, and veterans got $47.50 for the empty socket. Tillman also broke up the monopoly of the Coosaw Mining Company on the state’s phosphate beds (which was a key ingredient in chemical fertilizer) “and claimed to lower fertilizer costs.” A bill was also passed that limited the hours of labor in cotton mills. Although Tillman, as noted by one study, ‘never having shown much interest in the welfare of what he called “the damn factory class,” was willing to champion legislation that met the opposition of mill executives of the type of Orr.’ Tillman himself criticized long working hours. When Orr said that Tillman was "not fit to unlatch the shoes of Judge Wallace," he accused Orr of being "the president of a factory that is making poor men and women work thirteen hours a day."

Tillman's influence on the politics of South Carolina began to wane after he was elected by the legislature to the U.S. Senate in 1895. The Conservatives recaptured the legislature in 1902. The elite planter, Duncan Clinch Heyward, won the gubernatorial election. He made no substantial changes and Heyward continued to enforce the Dispensary Act at great difficulty. The state continued its rapid pace of industrialization, which gave rise to a new class of white voters, the cotton mill workers.

White sharecroppers and mill workers coalesced behind the candidacy of Tillmanite Cole Blease in the gubernatorial election of 1910. They believed that Blease was including them as an important part of the political force of the state. Instead, his four years in office were highly erratic in behavior. This helped to pave the way for a progressive, Richard I. Manning, to win the governorship in 1914.

== Economic booms and busts in late 19th–early 20th century ==
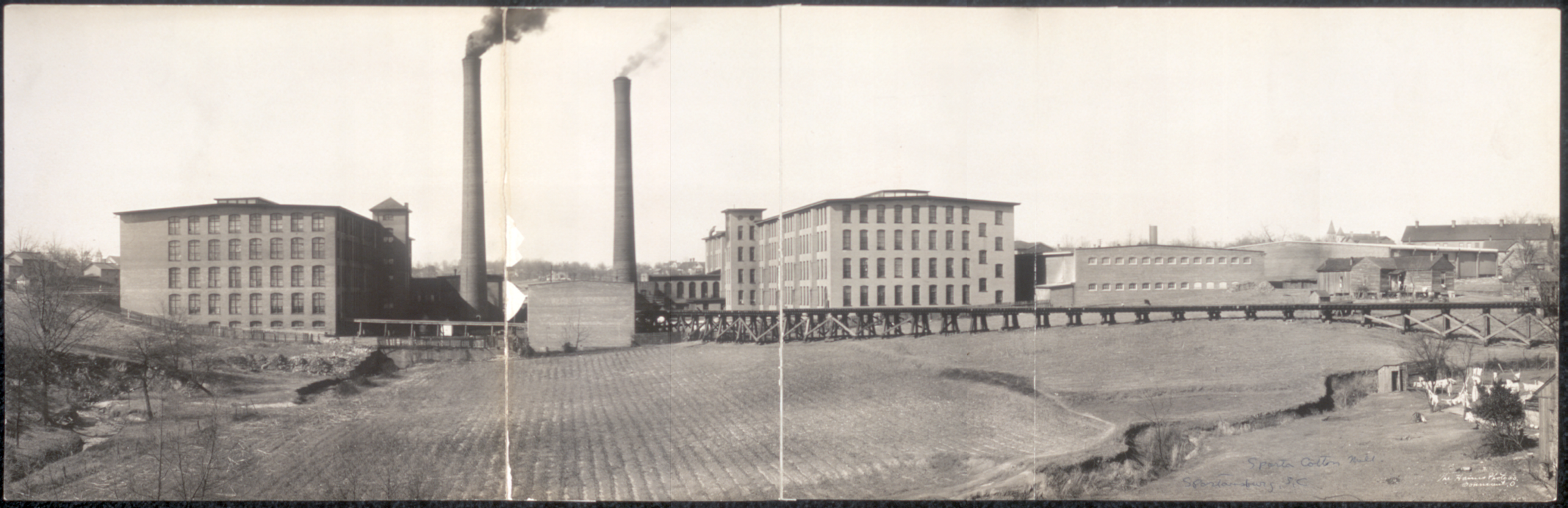
Sparta Cotton Mill in Spartanburg, South Carolina, 1909

In the 1880s Atlanta editor Henry W. Grady won attention in the state for his vision of a "New South", a South based on the modern industrial model. By now, the idea had already struck some enterprising South Carolinians that the cotton they were shipping north could also be processed in South Carolina mills. The idea was not new; in 1854, De Bow's Commercial Review of the South & West had boasted to investors of South Carolina's potential for manufacturing, citing its three lines of railroads, inexpensive raw materials, non-freezing rivers, and labor pool. Slavery was so profitable before 1860 that it absorbed available capital and repelled Northern investors, but now the time for industrialization was at hand. By 1900, the textile industry was established in upland areas, which had water-power and an available white labor force, comprising men, women, and children willing to move from hard-scrabble farms to mill towns.

In 1902, the Charleston Expedition drew visitors from around the world. President Theodore Roosevelt, whose mother had attended school in Columbia, called for reconciliation of still simmering animosities between the North and the South.

The Progressive Movement is said to have come to the state with Governor Richard Irvine Manning III in 1914. The expansion of bright-leaf tobacco around 1900 from North Carolina brought an agricultural boom. This was broken by the Great Depression starting in 1929, but the tobacco industry recovered and prospered until near the end of the 20th century. Cotton remained by far the dominant crop, despite low prices. The arrival of boll weevil infestation sharply reduced acreage, and especially yields. Farmers shifted to other crops.

Black sharecroppers and laborers began heading North in large numbers in the era of World War I, a Great Migration that continued through the mid-20th century, as they sought higher wages and much more favorable political conditions.

== Civil Rights Movement ==
As early as 1948, when Strom Thurmond ran for President on the States Rights ticket, South Carolina whites were showing discontent with the Democrats' post–World War II continuation of the New Deal's federalization of power. South Carolina blacks had problems with the Southern version of states' rights; by 1940, the voter registration provisions written into the 1895 constitution effectively still limited African American voters to 3,000—only 0.8 percent of those of voting age in the state. African Americans had not been able to elect a representative since the 19th century. Hundreds of thousands left the state for industrial cities in the Great Migration of the 20th century. By 1960, during the Civil Rights Movement, South Carolina had a population of 2,382,594, of whom nearly 35%, or 829,291 were African Americans, who had been without representation for 60 years. In addition, the state enforced legal racial segregation in public facilities.

Non-violent action against segregation began in Rock Hill in 1961, when nine black Friendship Junior College students took seats at the whites-only lunch counter at a downtown McCrory's and refused to leave. When police arrested them, the students were given the choice of paying $200 fines or serving 30 days of hard labor in the York County jail. The Friendship Nine, as they became known, chose the latter, gaining national attention in the Civil Rights Movement because of their decision to use the "jail, no bail" strategy.

== Late 20th century to present ==
=== Economic change ===
In 1950, North Carolina and South Carolina both ranked among "the poorest states in the country". In 1956, North Carolina Governor Luther H. Hodges began to lay the foundation for his state's rapid transformation over the next five decades into a prosperous global center of innovation. In contrast, South Carolina lacked such inspired leadership and failed to change its public policy. The state stubbornly "stayed the course, remaining focused on the same old business of low-wage manufacturing and low productivity agriculture", and continued to be one of the poorest states in the Union.

The rapid decline of agriculture in the state has been one of the most important developments since the 1960s. As late as 1960, more than half the state's cotton was picked by hand. Over the next twenty years, mechanization eliminated tens of thousands of jobs in rural counties. By 2000, only 24,000 farms were left, with fewer than 2% of the population; many others lived in rural areas on what were once farms, but they commuted to non-farm jobs. Cotton was no longer king, as cotton lands were converted into timberlands. Until the 1970s rural areas had controlled the legislature.

After 1972, both houses of the state legislature were reapportioned into single-member districts, ending another rural advantage. Coupled with the federal Voting Rights Act of 1965, which protected voting for African Americans, the reapportionment transformed South Carolina politics. The South Carolina Democratic party, which dominated the state for nearly a century after Reconstruction, began to decline at the state and county level with the 1994 elections. The majority white voters had been supporting Republican presidential candidates since the late 1960s and gradually elected the party candidates to local and state offices as well. Republicans won all but one statewide constitutional office, and control of the state house of representatives.

Fritz Hollings, governor 1959–63, who was a key supporter of development, executed a campaign to promote industrial training programs and implemented a state-wide economic development strategy. The end of the Cold War in 1990 brought the closing of military installations, such as the naval facilities in North Charleston, which Rep. Mendel Rivers had long sponsored. The quest for new jobs became a high state priority. Starting in 1975 the state used its attractive climate, lack of powerful labor unions, and low wage rates to attract foreign investment in factories, including Michelin, which located its U.S. headquarters in the state. The stretch of Interstate 85 from the North Carolina line to Greenville became "UN Alley" as international companies opened operations.

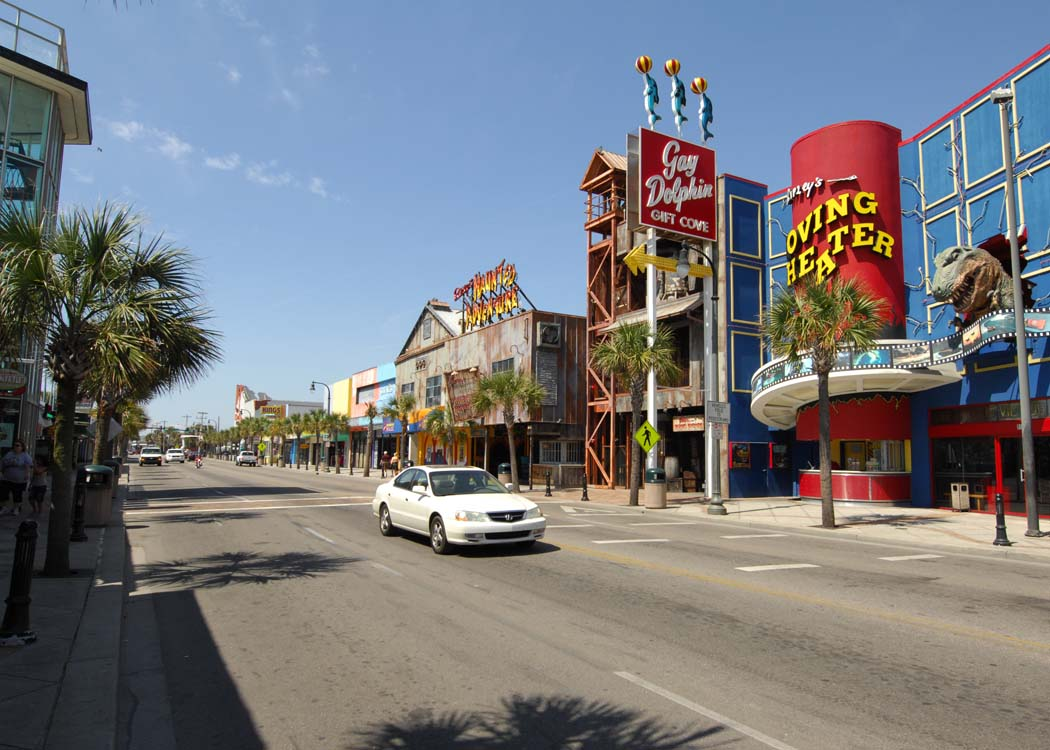
Myrtle Beach, North Ocean Boulevard in 2010

Tourism became a major industry, especially in the Myrtle Beach area. With its semitropical climate, cheap land and low construction costs (because of low wages), the state became a developer's dream. Barrier islands, such as Kiawah and Hilton Head, were developed as retirement communities for wealthy outsiders. The state's attempts to manage coastal development in an orderly and environmentally sound manner have run afoul of federal court decisions. The U.S. Supreme Court (in Lucas v. South Carolina Coastal Council) ruled that the state, in forbidding construction on threatened beachfront property, had, in effect, seized the plaintiff's property without due process of law. The rush to build upscale housing along the coast paid its price in the billions of dollars of losses as Hurricane Hugo swept through on September 21–22, 1989. Charleston was more used to hurricanes; historical preservation groups immediately stepped in to begin salvage and reconstruction, with the result that one year after Hugo, the city was virtually returned to normal.

By the late 1980s, however, the state's economic growth rate flattened. South Carolina's development plan focused on offering low taxes and attracting low-wage industries, but the state's low levels of education have failed to attract high wage, high tech industries.

In 1991, under the leadership of then Governor Carroll A. Campbell, the state successfully recruited BMW's (Bavarian Motor Works) only U.S. auto factory to the city of Greer, in Spartanburg County. Second-tier and third-tier auto parts suppliers to BMW likewise established assembly and distribution facilities near the factory, creating a significant shift in manufacturing from textiles to automotive.

In 2009, the state outbid the state of Washington for a giant new Boeing plant, to be constructed in North Charleston. Boeing must create at least 3,800 jobs and invest more than $750 million within seven years to take advantage of the various tax inducements, worth $450 million.

=== Politics ===
In the 1970s, South Carolina white voters elected the state's first Republican governor since Reconstruction. In 1987 and 1991, the state elected and reelected Governor Carroll Campbell, another Republican. Many politicians switched from the Democratic Party to the GOP, including David Beasley, a former Democrat who claimed to have undergone a spiritual rebirth; he was elected governor as a Republican. In 1996, Beasley surprised citizens by announcing that he could not justify keeping the Confederate flag flying over the capitol. He said that a "spate of racially motivated violence compelled him to reconsider the politics and symbolism of the Confederate flag, and he concluded it should be moved." Traditionalists were further surprised when Bob Jones III, head of Bob Jones University, announced he held the same view.

Beasley was upset for reelection in 1998 by the little-known Jim Hodges, a state assemblyman from Lancaster. Hodges attacked Beasley's opposition to the creation of a state lottery to support education. Hodges called for a fresh tax base to improve public education. Despite Hodges' unwillingness to join Beasley in his opposition to flying the Confederate flag, the NAACP announced its support for Hodges. (At the same time the NAACP demanded a boycott of conferences in the state over the flag issue). Hodges reportedly accepted millions in contributions from the gambling industry, which some estimated spent a total of $10 million to defeat Beasley.

After the election, with public opinions steadfastly against video gambling, Hodges asked for a statewide referendum on the issue. He claimed that he would personally join the expected majority in saying "no" on legalized gambling, but vowed not to campaign against it. Critics in both parties suggested that Hodges' debts to the state's gambling interests were keeping him from campaigning against legalized gambling. The state constitution does not provide for referendums except for ratification of amendments. State legislators shut down the state's video casinos soon after Hodges took office.

Upon his election, Hodges announced that he agreed with Beasley's increasingly popular compromise proposal on the Confederate flag issue. He supported the flag's transfer to a Confederate monument on the State House's grounds. Many South Carolinians agreed with this position as the only solution. Further, they admired Hodges' solution to nuclear waste shipments to the state. Hodges alienated moderate voters sufficiently so that in 2002, most of the state's major newspapers supported the Republican Mark Sanford to replace him. Hodges was held responsible for the state's mishandling of the Hurricane Floyd evacuation in 1999. By 2002, most of the funds from Hodges' "South Carolina Education Lottery" were used to pay for college scholarships, rather than to improve impoverished rural and inner-city schools. Religious leaders denounced the lottery as taxing the poor to pay for higher education for the middle class.

In the lottery's first year, Hodges' administration awarded $40 million for "LIFE Scholarships", granted to any South Carolinian student with a B average, graduation in the top 30% of the student's high school class, and an 1,100 SAT score. Hodges' administration awarded $5.8 million for "HOPE Scholarships", which had lower GPA requirements.

Hodges lost his campaign for reelection in 2002 against the Republican conservative Mark Sanford, a former U.S. congressman from Sullivan's Island.

Mark Sanford served two terms as governor from 2003 to 2011. He left office in the heat of a political scandal; while in office, Sanford took a trip to Argentina without anyone's knowing it, and he reportedly had an affair with a woman. Sanford later publicly apologized for the affair, but he and his wife, Jenny Sullivan, divorced in 2010. Sanford was elected to the United States House of Representatives from South Carolina's 1st District in May 2013, a position which he also held from 1995 to 2003.

In 2010, Nikki Haley, who took office as Governor of South Carolina in January 2011, became the first female to be elected governor. Additionally, Haley was the first person of Asian-Indian descent to be elected governor. In 2012, Governor Haley appointed Tim Scott as one of South Carolina's two United States Senators. In 2014, Scott won election to the office and became the first African-American to serve as U.S. Senator from South Carolina since the Reconstruction era. Haley served from 2011 until 2017; President Donald Trump nominated her as the United States Ambassador to the United Nations, a position she accepted and for which she was approved by the United States Senate. After Haley's resignation on January 24, 2017, Henry McMaster became the incumbent, 117th governor of South Carolina.

== See also ==
- Outline of South Carolina
- African Americans in South Carolina
  - History of slavery in South Carolina
  - Black Belt in the American South
- Colonial South and the Chesapeake
- Deep South
- Education in South Carolina
- Economy of South Carolina
- Grand Model for the Province of Carolina
- History of the Southern United States
- Indian slave trade between Barbados and South Carolina
- List of historical societies in South Carolina
- List of newspapers in South Carolina in the 18th century
- List of museums in South Carolina
- American Revolutionary War Early Engagements – engagements in South Carolina placed in overall sequence and strategic context

City timelines

- Timeline of Charleston, South Carolina
- Timeline of Columbia, South Carolina

== Bibliography ==
=== Textbooks and surveys ===
- Chapman, John Abney. School History of South Carolina, (1894) one of the first textbooks used in public schools state-wide
- Edgar, Walter. South Carolina: A History, (1998) a standard scholarly history; online
- Edgar, Walter. South Carolina in the modern age (1992) online; a standard scholarly history covers 1890 to 1991.
- Edgar, Walter, ed. The South Carolina Encyclopedia, (University of South Carolina Press, 2006) ISBN 1-57003-598-9, the most comprehensive scholarly guide
- Fordham, Damon L. True Stories of Black South Carolina (2008), popular.
- Morris, J. Brent. Yes, Lord, I Know the Road: A Documentary History of African Americans in South Carolina, 1526–2008 (2017)
- Peirce, Neal R. The Deep South States of America: People, Politics, and Power in the Seven Deep South States (1974) solid reporting on politics and economics 1960–72
- Rogers, Jr., George C. "Who is a South Carolinian?", South Carolina Historical Magazine, Oct 2000, Vol. 101 Issue 4, pp. 319–329, emphasis on race, ethnicity and identity
- Rogers Jr. George C. and C. James Taylor. A South Carolina Chronology, 1497–1992 (2nd ed. 1994)
- Spruill, Marjorie Julian et al. eds. South Carolina Women: Their Lives and Times (3 vol, 2009–12) long scholarly biographies; vol 3 online
- Wallace, David Duncan. South Carolina: A Short History, 1520–1948 (1951), older scholarly history
- WPA. South Carolina: A Guide to the Palmetto State (1941), famous guide to all the town and cities
- Wright, Louis B. South Carolina: A Bicentennial History (1976), popular survey online

=== Scholarly studies: to 1865 ===
- Brannon, Rebecca/ From Revolution to Reunion: The Reintegration of the South Carolina Loyalists (2016) online review at H-Early-America, H-Net Reviews. May, 2018.
- Brown, Richard Maxwell. The South Carolina Regulators: The Story of the First American Vigilante Movement. (Harvard University Press) 1963, a major scholarly history.
- Burton, Orville Vernon. In My Father's House Are Many Mansions: Family and Community in Edgefield, South Carolina. (1985) online
- Carney, Judith A. Black Rice: The African Origins of Rice Cultivation in the Americas. Cambridge, MA: Harvard University Press, 2002.
- Chaplin, Joyce E. "Creating a Cotton South in Georgia and South Carolina, 1760–1815". Journal of Southern History 57.2 (1991): 171–200 online.
- Clarke, Erskine. Our Southern Zion: A History of Calvinism in the South Carolina Low Country, 1690–1990 (1996) online
- Channing, Steven. Crisis of Fear: Secession in South Carolina (1970) online
- Coclanis, Peter A., "Global Perspectives on the Early Economic History of South Carolina", South Carolina Historical Magazine, 106 (April–July 2005), 130–46.
- Crane, Verner W. The Southern Frontier, 1670–1732 (1956) online
- Feeser, Andrea. Red, White, and Black Make Blue: Indigo in the Fabric of Colonial South Carolina Life (University of Georgia Press; 2013) 140 pages; scholarly study explains how the plant's popularity as a dye bound together local and transatlantic communities, slave and free, in the 18th century.
- Ford Jr., Lacy K. Origins of Southern Radicalism: The South Carolina Upcountry, 1800–1860 (1991) online
- Gray, Lewis C. History of Agriculture in the Southern United States to 1860 (2 vol. 1933) vol 1 online; .also see vol 2 online
- Hart, Emma. Building Charleston: Town and Society in the Eighteenth Century British Atlantic World (University of Virginia Press 2010, University of South Carolina Press, 2015)
- Johnson Jr., George Lloyd. The Frontier in the Colonial South: South Carolina Backcountry, 1736–1800 (1997)
- Jedidiah Morse (1797). "South Carolina". The American Gazetteer. Boston, Massachusetts: At the presses of S. Hall, and Thomas & Andrews. OL 23272543M.
- Madsen, David B. (2004). Entering America: northeast Asia and Beringia before the last glacial maximum. Salt Lake City: University of Utah Press. ISBN 978-0-87480-786-8.
- Nagl, Dominik. No Part of the Mother Country, but Distinct Dominions - Law, State Formation and Governance in England, Massachusetts and South Carolina, 1630–1769 (LIT, 2013). online
- Powers, Bernard E., Jr., "'The Worst of All Barbarism': Racial Anxiety and the Approach of Secession in the Palmetto State", South Carolina Historical Magazine 112 (July–Oct. 2011), 139–56.
- Rogers, George C. Evolution of a Federalist: William Loughton Smith of Charleston (1758–1812) (1962)
- Roper, L. H. Conceiving Carolina: Proprietors, Planters, and Plots, 1662–1729 Palgrave Macmillan, ISBN 1-4039-6479-3.
- Scarborough, William K., "Propagandists for Secession: Edmund Ruffin of Virginia and Robert Barnwell Rhett of South Carolina", South Carolina Historical Magazine 112 (July–Oct. 2011), 126–38.
- Schultz, Harold S. Nationalism and Sectionalism in South Carolina, 1852–1860 (1950)
- Sinha, Manisha. The Counterrevolution of Slavery: Politics and Ideology in Antebellum South Carolina (2000)
- Smith, Warren B. White Servitude in Colonial South Carolina (1961)
- Tuten, James H. Lowcountry Time and Tide: The Fall of the South Carolina Rice Kingdom (University of South Carolina Press, 2010), 178 pp. ISBN 978-1-57003-926-3
- Wilson, Thomas D. The Ashley Cooper Plan: The Founding of Carolina and the Origins of Southern Political Culture. Chapel Hill, NC: University of North Carolina Press, 2016.
- Wood, Peter H. Black Majority: Negroes in Colonial South Carolina from 1670 Through the Stono Rebellion (1996)

=== Scholarly studies: since 1865 ===
- Bartels, Virginia B. "The History of South Carolina Schools" (Center for Educator Recruitment, Retention, and Advancement, 2005) online
- Bass, Jack and Marilyn W. Thompson. Ol' Strom: An Unauthorized Biography of Strom Thurmond,. (2003)
- Bedingfield, Sid, "John H. McCray, Accommodationism, and the Framing of the Civil Rights Struggle in South Carolina, 1940–48", Journalism History 37 (Summer 2011), 91–101.
- Brock, Euline W. "Thomas W. Cardozo: Fallible Black Reconstruction Leader". Journal of Southern History 47.2 (1981): 183–206. in JSTOR
- Brown, D. Clayton. King Cotton: A Cultural, Political, and Economic History since 1945 (University Press of Mississippi, 2011), 440 pp. ISBN 978-1-60473-798-1
- Carlton, David L. Mill and Town in South Carolina, 1880–1920 (1982)
- Clarke, Erskine. Our Southern Zion: A History of Calvinism in the South Carolina Low Country, 1690–1990 (1996)
- Cooper Jr., William J. The Conservative Regime: South Carolina, 1877–1890 (1968).
- Ford, Lacy K. "Rednecks and Merchants: Economic Development and Social Tensions in the South Carolina Upcountry, 1865–1900", Journal of American History, LXXI (September 1984), 294–318; in JSTOR
- Hine, William C. "Dr. Benjamin A. Boseman, Jr.: Charleston's Black Physician-Politician", in Howard N. Rabinowitz, ed. Southern Black Leaders of the Reconstruction Era (1982), pp. 335–362.
- Holt, Thomas. Black over white: Negro political leadership in South Carolina during Reconstruction (1979).
- Holt, Thomas C. "Negro State Legislators in South Carolina during Reconstruction", in Howard N. Rabinowitz, ed. Southern Black Leaders of the Reconstruction Era (1982), pp. 223–249.
- Kantrowitz, Stephen. Ben Tillman & the Reconstruction of White Supremacy (2002)
- Kantrowitz, Stephen. "Ben Tillman and Hendrix McLane, Agrarian Rebels: White Manhood, 'The Farmers,' and the Limits of Southern Populism". Journal of Southern History. Volume: 66. Issue: 3. (2000), pp. 497+. online edition
- Keyserling, Harriet. Against the Tide: One Woman's Political Struggle. University of South Carolina Press, 1998.
- Knight, Edgar Wallace. The influence of reconstruction on education in the South (1913) focus on North Carolina and South Carolina online
- Lamson, Peggy. The Glorious Failure: Black Congressman Robert Brown Elliott and the Reconstruction in South Carolina (1973).
- Minchin, Timothy J., "An Uphill Fight: Ernest F. Hollings and the Struggle to Protect the South Carolina Textile Industry, 1959–2005", South Carolina Historical Magazine, 109 (July 2008), 187–211.
- Peirce, Neal R. The Deep South States of America: People, Politics, and Power in the Seven Deep South States; (1974); solid reporting on politics and economics 1960–72
- Reynolds, John S. Reconstruction is South Carolina: 1865–1877 (1905) online free
- Simon, Bryant. A Fabric of Defeat: The Politics of South Carolina Millhands, 1910–1948 (1998)
- Simkins, Francis Butler. The Tillman Movement in South Carolina (1926)
- Simkins, Francis Butler. Pitchfork Ben Tillman: South Carolinian (1944)
- Simkins, Francis Butler, and Robert Hilliard Woody. South Carolina during Reconstruction (1932).
- Slap, Andrew; "The Spirit of '76: The Reconstruction of History in the Redemption of South Carolina" in The Historian. Volume: 63. Issue: 4. 2001. pp. 769+ on 1876
- Sweat, Edward F. "Some Notes on the Role of Negroes in the Establishment of Public Schools in South Carolina." Phylon 22.2 (1961): 160-166. online
- Thomas, June M. Struggling to Learn: An Intimate History of School Desegregation in South Carolina (University of South Carolina Press, 2022)
- Tullos, Allen Habits of Industry: White Culture and the Transformation of the Carolina Piedmont (1989)
- Tuten, James H. Lowcountry Time and Tide: The Fall of the South Carolina Rice Kingdom (U. of South Carolina Press, 2010), 178 pp. covers 1877–1930 online review
- Walker, John, et al. eds. The Organization of Public Education in South Carolina (1992), chapters on history of schools.
- Williamson Joel R. After Slavery: The Negro in South Carolina during Reconstruction, 1861–1877 (1965)
- Woody, Robert H. "Jonathan Jasper Wright, Associate Justice of the Supreme Court of South Carolina, 1870–77". Journal of Negro History 18.2 (1933): 114–131. in JSTOR, Leading black jurist
- Zucek, Richard. State of Rebellion: Reconstruction in South Carolina (U of South Carolina Press, 1996)

=== Local studies ===
- Bass, Jack and Jack Nelson.The Orangeburg Massacre,. Mercer University Press, 1992.
- Burton, Orville Vernon. In My Father's House Are Many Mansions: Family and Community in Edgefield, South Carolina (1985), new social history
- Carlton, David L. Mill and Town in South Carolina, 1880–1920 (1982)
- Doyle, Don H. New Men, New Cities, New South: Atlanta, Nashville, Charleston, Mobile, 1860–1910 (1990)
- Graham, Latria (March 8, 2016). "Why these harrowing testimonies of freed slaves are still relevant". The Guardian. (Spartanburg).
- Huff, Jr., Archie Vernon. Greenville: The History of the City and County in the South Carolina Piedmont (1995)
- Moore, John Hammond. Columbia and Richland County: A South Carolina Community, 1740–1990 (1993)
- Pease, William H. and Jane H. Pease. The Web of Progress: Private Values and Public Styles in Boston and Charleston, 18T28–1843 (1985),* Rose, Willie Lee. Rehearsal for Reconstruction: The Port Royal Experiment (1964), land for freed slaves

=== Primary sources ===
- Morris, Brent. Yes, Lord, I Know the Road: A Documentary History of African Americans in South Carolina, 1526–2008 (Univ of South Carolina Press, 2017)
- Work Projects Administration. Slave Narratives: a Folk History of Slavery in the United States / From Interviews with Former Slaves / South Carolina Narratives (1939) online
