= Washington (state) =

U.S. state

- State
- Flag Seal
- Nickname: "The Evergreen State" (de facto)
- Motto(s): Alki (Chinook jargon for 'By and By')
- Anthem: "Washington, My Home"
- Location of Washington within the United States
- Country: United States
- Before statehood: Washington Territory
- Admitted to the Union: November 11, 1889; 137 years ago (42nd)
- Capital: Olympia
- Largest city: Seattle
- Largest county or equivalent: King
- Largest metro and urban areas: Seattle

Government
  - Governor: Bob Ferguson (D)
  - Lieutenant Governor: Denny Heck (D)
- Legislature: State Legislature
  - Upper house: State Senate
  - Lower house: House of Representatives
- Judiciary: Washington Supreme Court
- U.S. senators: Patty Murray (D); Maria Cantwell (D)
- U.S. House delegation: 8 Democrats; 2 Republicans (list)

Area
  - Total: 71,362 sq mi (184,827 km^{2})
  - Land: 66,636 sq mi (172,587 km^{2})
  - Water: 4,725 sq mi (12,237 km^{2}) 6.6%
  - Rank: 18th

Dimensions
  - Length: 250 mi (400 km)
  - Width: 360 mi (580 km)
- Elevation: 1,710 ft (520 m)
- Highest elevation (Mount Rainier): 14,400 ft (4,390 m)
- Lowest elevation (Pacific Ocean): 0 ft (0 m)

Population (2025)
  - Total: ▲8,001,020
  - Rank: 13th
  - Density: 103/sq mi (39.6/km^{2})
  - Rank: 22nd
  - Median household income: $94,600 (2023)
  - Income rank: 7th
- Demonym: Washingtonian

Language
  - Official language: None (de jure); English (de facto)
- Time zone: UTC−08:00 (Pacific)
  - Summer (DST): UTC−07:00 (PDT)
- USPS abbreviation: WA
- ISO 3166 code: US-WA
- Traditional abbreviation: Wash.
- Latitude: 45°33′ N to 49° N
- Longitude: 116°55′ W to 124°46′ W
- Website: wa.gov
- ASN: 4193

State symbols of Washington
List of state symbols
- Flag of Washington

- Seal of Washington

Living insignia
- Amphibian: Pacific chorus frog
- Bird: Willow goldfinch
- Fish: Steelhead trout
- Flower: Rhododendron
- Grass: Bluebunch wheatgrass
- Insect: Green darner
- Mammal: Endemic: Olympic marmot Aquatic: Orca
- Tree: Western hemlock
- Vegetable: Sweet onion

Inanimate insignia
- Dance: Square dance
- Dinosaur: Suciasaurus rex
- Food: Apple
- Fossil: Columbian mammoth
- Gemstone: Petrified wood
- Ship: Lady Washington
- Soil: Tokul
- Sport: Pickleball
- Tartan: Washington state tartan

State route marker

State quarter
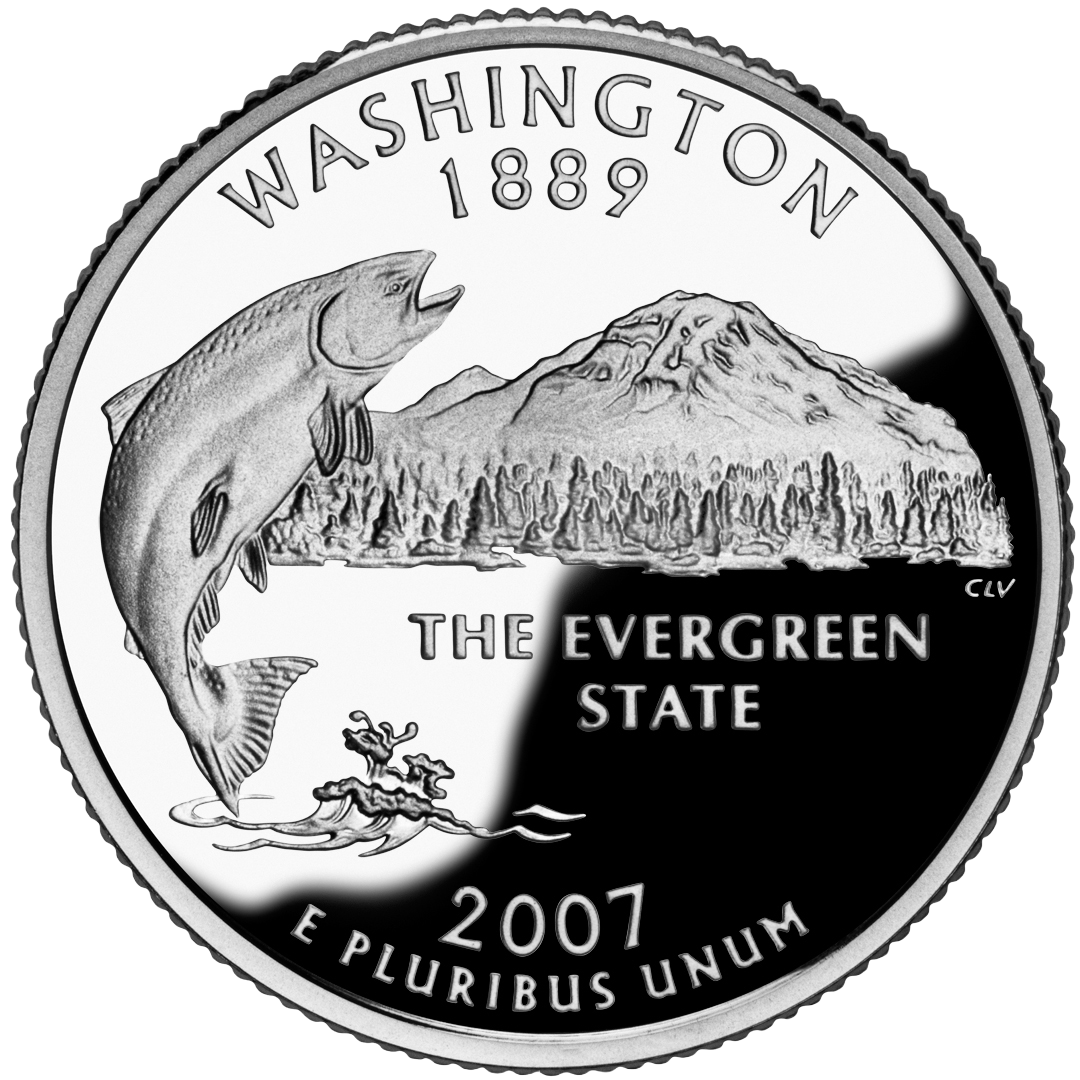
- Released in 2007

Washington is a state in the Pacific Northwest region of the United States. It is commonly referred to as Washington state (Note: Capitalization varies depending on whether or not "state" is considered part of the name of the state, a proper noun. The AP Stylebook prefers the lowercase version, as does The Chicago Manual of Style since the 18th edition in 2024. The official website (wa.gov) says it is the "official website of Washington State".) to distinguish it from the national capital; both are named after George Washington, a U.S. Founding Father and the first U.S. president. Washington borders the Pacific Ocean to the west, Oregon to the south, and Idaho to the east; it shares an international border with the Canadian province of British Columbia to the north. Olympia is the state capital, and the state's most populous city is Seattle.

Washington is the 18th-largest state, with an area of 71,362 sq mi (184,830 km^{2}), and the 13th-most populous state, with a population of over 8 million. The majority of Washington's residents live in the Seattle metropolitan area, the center of transportation, business, and industry on Puget Sound, an inlet of the Pacific Ocean consisting of numerous islands, deep fjords and bays carved out by glaciers. The remainder of the state consists of deep temperate rainforests in the west; mountain ranges in the west, center, northeast, and far southeast, and a semi-arid basin region in the east, center, and south, given over to intensive agriculture. Washington is the second-most populous state on the West Coast and in the Western United States, after California. Mount Rainier, an active stratovolcano, is the state's highest elevation at 14,400 feet (4,389 meters), and is the most topographically prominent mountain in the contiguous U.S.

Washington is a leading lumber producer, the largest producer of apples, hops, pears, blueberries, spearmint oil, and sweet cherries in the U.S., and ranks high in the production of apricots, asparagus, dry edible peas, grapes, lentils, peppermint oil, potatoes and wheat. Livestock, livestock products, and commercial fishing—particularly of salmon, halibut, and bottomfish—are also significant contributors to the state's economy. Washington ranks third in wine production. Manufacturing industries in Washington include aircraft, missiles, shipbuilding, and other transportation equipment, food processing, metals, and metal products, chemicals, and machinery.

The state was formed from the western part of the Washington Territory, the claims to which were ceded by the British Empire in the Oregon Treaty of 1846. Most of the land that would become Washington state was ceded by the Indigenous peoples of the region in the Stevens treaties of 1854–1855. It was admitted to the Union as the 42nd state in 1889. One of the wealthiest and most socially liberal states in the country, Washington consistently ranks among the top states for highest life expectancy and employment rates. It was one of the first states (alongside Colorado) to legalize medicinal and recreational cannabis, was among the first states to introduce same-sex marriage, and permitted legal abortions on request before Roe v. Wade in 1973.

== Etymology ==
Washington was named after President George Washington by an act of the United States Congress during the creation of Washington Territory in 1853; the territory was originally to be named "Columbia", for the Columbia River and the Columbia District, but Kentucky representative Richard H. Stanton found the name too similar to the District of Columbia (the nation's capital, itself containing the city of Washington), and proposed naming the new territory after President Washington. Thus, Washington is the only U.S. state named after a president.

Confusion between the state of Washington and the city of Washington, D.C., led to renaming proposals during the statehood process for Washington in 1889, including David Dudley Field II's suggestion to name the new state "Tacoma"; these proposals failed to garner support. Washington, D.C.'s, own statehood movement in the 21st century has included a proposal to use the name "State of Washington, Douglass Commonwealth", which would conflict with the current state of Washington. Residents of Washington (known as "Washingtonians") and the Pacific Northwest simply refer to the state as "Washington", and the nation's capital "Washington, D.C.", "the other Washington", or simply "D.C."

== History ==
=== Early history ===
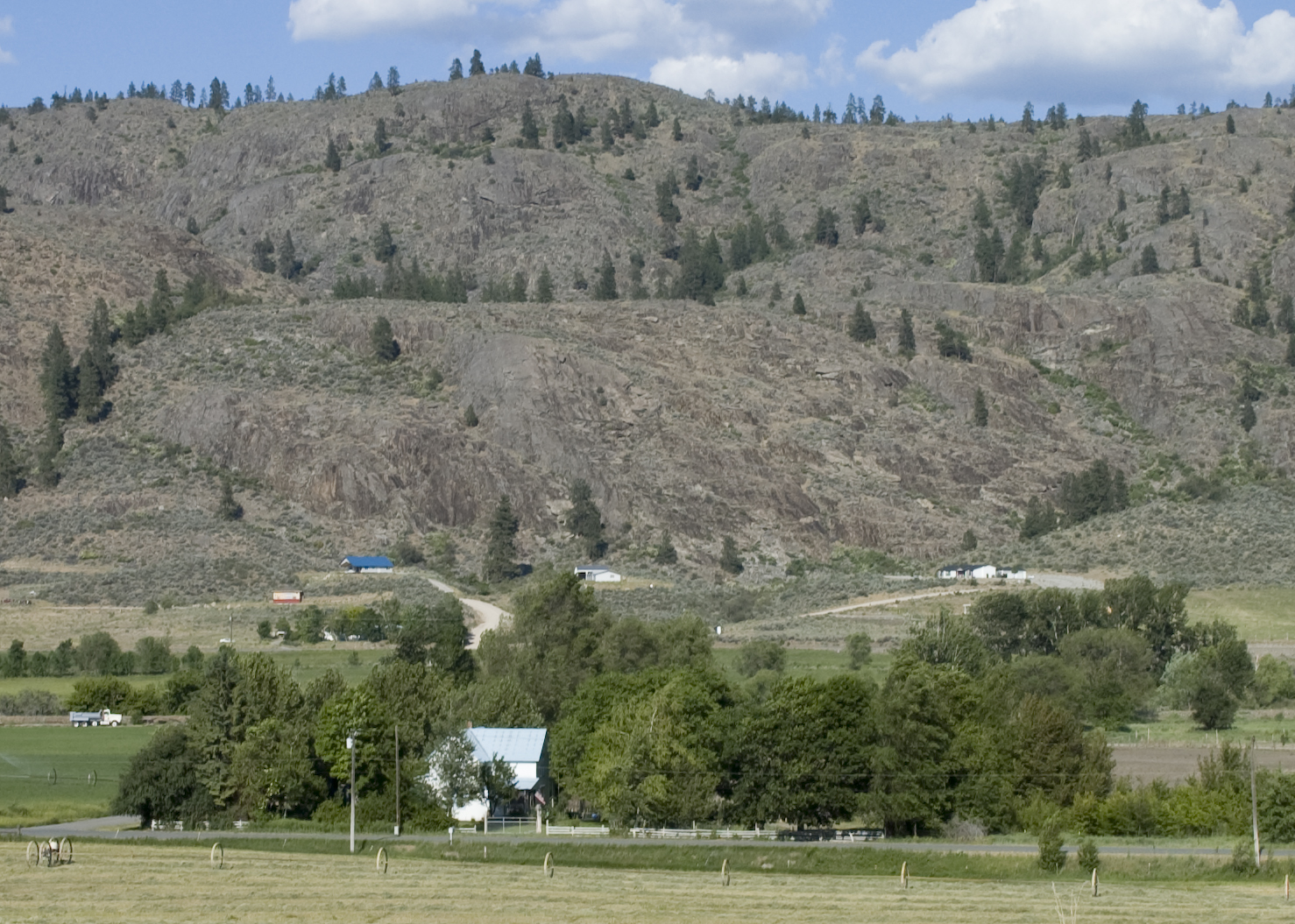
A farm and barren hills near Riverside, in north-central Washington

The skeletal remains of Kennewick Man, one of the oldest and most complete human remains found in North America, were discovered in Washington in 1996 and radiocarbon dated to between 8,400 and 8,690 years Before Present. The region has been home to many established tribes of indigenous peoples for thousands of years. They are notable for their ornately carved welcome figures, canoes, long houses and masks. Prominent among their industries were salmon fishing and, notably among the Makah, whale hunting. The peoples of the Interior had a different subsistence-based culture based on hunting, food-gathering and some forms of agriculture, as well as a dependency on salmon from the Columbia and its tributaries.

The area has been known to host megathrust earthquakes in the past, the last being the Cascadia earthquake of 1700.

=== European exploration ===
The first recorded European landing on the Washington coast was by Spanish Captain Don Bruno de Heceta in 1775 at what is now Point Grenville, on board the Santiago, part of a two-ship flotilla with the Sonora. He claimed the coastal lands up to Prince William Sound for Spain as part of their claimed rights under the Treaty of Tordesillas, which they maintained made the Pacific a "Spanish lake" and all its shores part of the Spanish Empire. Soon thereafter, the smallpox epidemic of the 1770s devastated the Native American population.

In 1778, British explorer Captain James Cook sighted Cape Flattery, at the entrance to the Strait of Juan de Fuca, but Cook did not realize the strait existed. It was not discovered until Charles William Barkley, captain of the Imperial Eagle, sighted it in 1787. The straits were further explored by Spanish explorers Manuel Quimper in 1790 and Francisco de Eliza in 1791, and British explorer George Vancouver in 1792.

=== European settlement ===
The Nootka Convention of 1790 ended Spanish claims of exclusivity and opened the Northwest Coast to explorers and traders from other nations, most notably Britain, Russia, and the fledgling United States. American captain Robert Gray (for whom Grays Harbor County is named) then discovered the mouth of the Columbia River. He named the river after his ship, the Columbia. Beginning in 1792, Gray established trade in sea otter pelts. The Lewis and Clark Expedition entered the state on October 10, 1805.

Explorer David Thompson, on his voyage down the Columbia River, camped at the confluence with the Snake River on July 9, 1811, and erected a pole and a notice claiming the territory for Great Britain and stating the intention of the North West Company to build a trading post at the site.

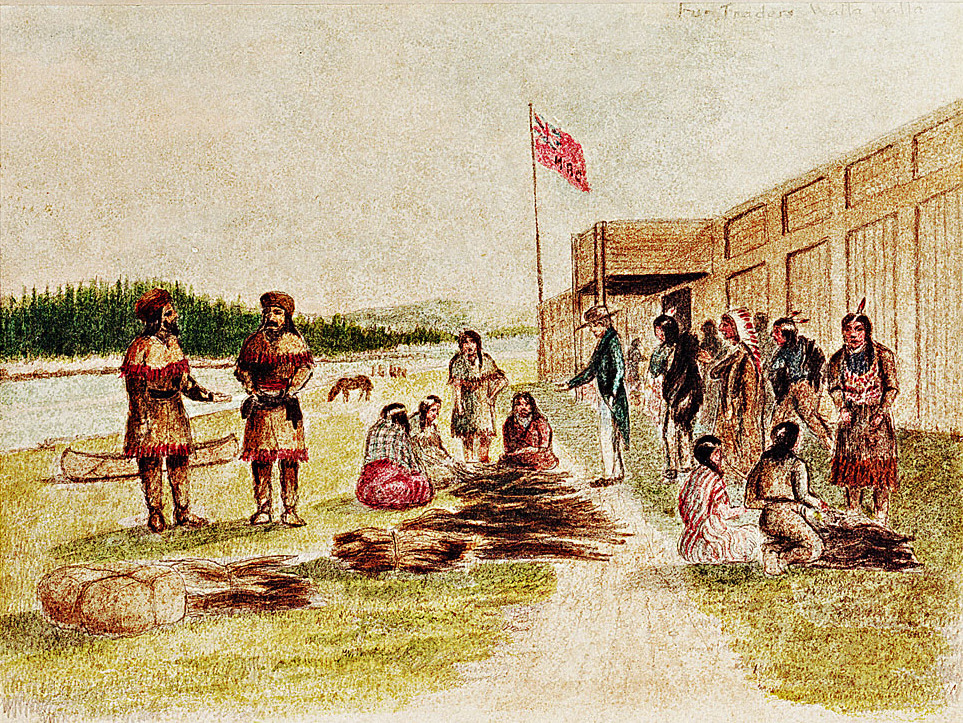
Fur trading at Fort Nez Percés in 1841

Britain and the United States agreed to what has since been described as "joint occupancy" of lands west of the Continental Divide to the Pacific Ocean as part of the Anglo-American Convention of 1818, which established the 49th parallel as the international boundary west from Lake of the Woods to the Rocky Mountains. Resolution of the territorial and treaty issues west to the Pacific was deferred until a later time. In 1819, Spain ceded its rights north of the 42nd parallel to the United States.

Negotiations with Great Britain over the next few decades failed to settle upon a compromise boundary and the Oregon boundary dispute was highly contested between Britain and the United States. Disputed joint occupancy by Britain and the U.S. lasted for several decades. With American settlers pouring into Oregon Country, Hudson's Bay Company, which had previously discouraged settlement because it conflicted with the fur trade, reversed its position in an attempt to maintain British control of the Columbia District.

Fur trapper James Sinclair, on orders from Sir George Simpson, Governor of the Hudson's Bay Company, led some 200 settlers from the Red River Colony west in 1841 to settle on Hudson Bay Company farms near Fort Vancouver. The party crossed the Rockies into the Columbia Valley, near present-day Radium Hot Springs, British Columbia, then traveled south-west down the Kootenai River and Columbia River. Despite such efforts, Britain eventually ceded all claims to land south of the 49th parallel to the United States in the Oregon Treaty on June 15, 1846.

In 1836, a group of missionaries, including Marcus Whitman, established several missions and Whitman's own settlement Waiilatpu, in what is now southeastern Washington state, near present-day Walla Walla County, in the territory of both the Cayuse and the Nez Perce Indian tribes. Whitman's settlement would in 1843 help the Oregon Trail, the overland emigration route to the west, get established for thousands of emigrants in the following decades. Whitman provided medical care for the Native Americans, but when Indian patients—lacking immunity to new, "European" diseases—died in striking numbers, while at the same time many white patients recovered, they held "medicine man" Marcus Whitman personally responsible, and executed Whitman and twelve other white settlers. This was called the Whitman massacre in 1847. This event triggered the Cayuse War between settlers and Indians.

Fort Nisqually, a farm and trading post of the Hudson's Bay Company and the first European settlement in the Puget Sound area, was founded in 1833. Black pioneer George Washington Bush and his Caucasian wife, Isabella James Bush, from Missouri and Tennessee, respectively, led four white families into the territory and founded New Market, now Tumwater, in 1846. They settled in Washington to avoid Oregon's black exclusion law, which prohibited African Americans from entering the territory while simultaneously prohibiting slavery. After them, many more settlers, migrating overland along the Oregon Trail, wandered north to settle in the Puget Sound area.

Spanish and Russian claims to the region were ceded in the early 19th century through a series of treaties. The Spanish signed the Adams–Onís Treaty of 1819, and the Russians the Russo-American Treaty of 1824 and 1825.

The Oregon Question remained contested between the United Kingdom and the United States until the 1846 Oregon Treaty established the border between British North America and the United States along the 49th parallel until the Strait of Georgia. Vague wording in the treaty left the ownership of the San Juan Islands in doubt; during the so-called Pig War, both nations agreed to a joint military occupation of the islands. Kaiser Wilhelm I of the German Empire was selected as an arbitrator to end the dispute, with a three-man commission ruling in favor of the United States in 1872. The border established by the Oregon Treaty and finalized by the arbitration in 1872 remains the boundary between Washington and British Columbia.

=== Statehood ===
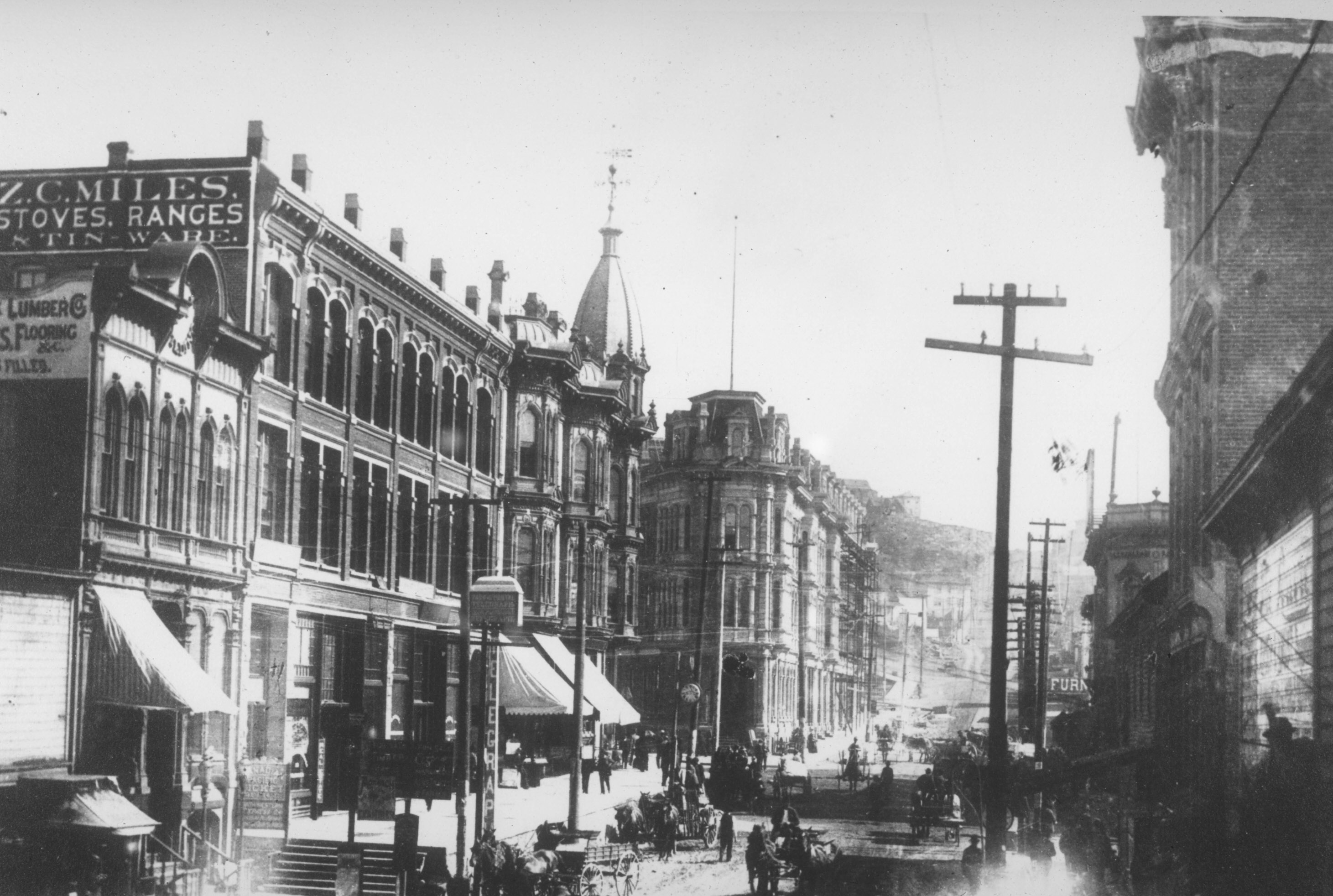
Yesler Way in Seattle, 1887

The growing population of Oregon Territory north of the Columbia River formally requested a new territory. As a result of the Monticello Convention, held in present-day Cowlitz County, the U.S. Congress passed legislation to create Washington Territory. It was signed into law by President Millard Fillmore on March 2, 1853. The boundary of Washington Territory initially extended farther east than the present state, including what is now the Idaho panhandle and parts of western Montana, and picked up more land to the southeast that was left behind when Oregon was admitted as a state; the creation of Idaho Territory in 1863 established the final eastern border.

A Washington state constitution was drafted and ratified in 1878, but it was never officially adopted. Although never approved by the United States Congress, the 1878 constitution is an important historical document that shows the political thinking of the time; it was used extensively during the drafting of Washington state's 1889 constitution, the one and only official Constitution of the State of Washington. Washington became the 42nd state of the United States on November 11, 1889.

Early prominent industries in the new state included agriculture and lumber. In Eastern Washington, the Yakima River Valley became known for its apple orchards, while the growth of wheat using dry farming techniques became particularly productive. Heavy rainfall to the west of the Cascade Range produced dense forests, and the ports along Puget Sound prospered from the manufacturing and shipping of lumber products, particularly the Douglas fir. Other industries that developed in the state included fishing, salmon canning and mining.

=== Post-statehood ===
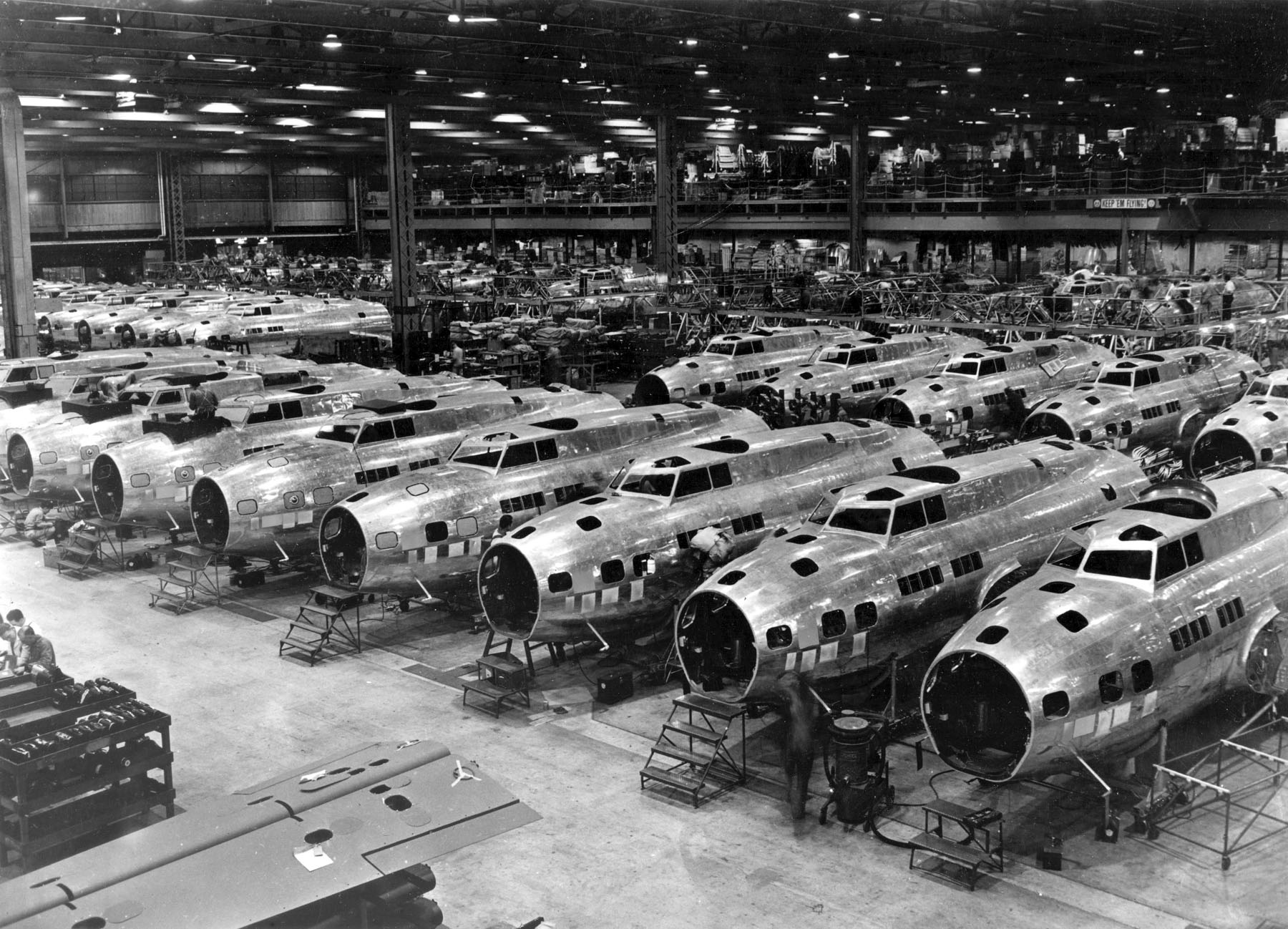
Boeing B-17E Flying Fortress bombers under construction, circa 1942

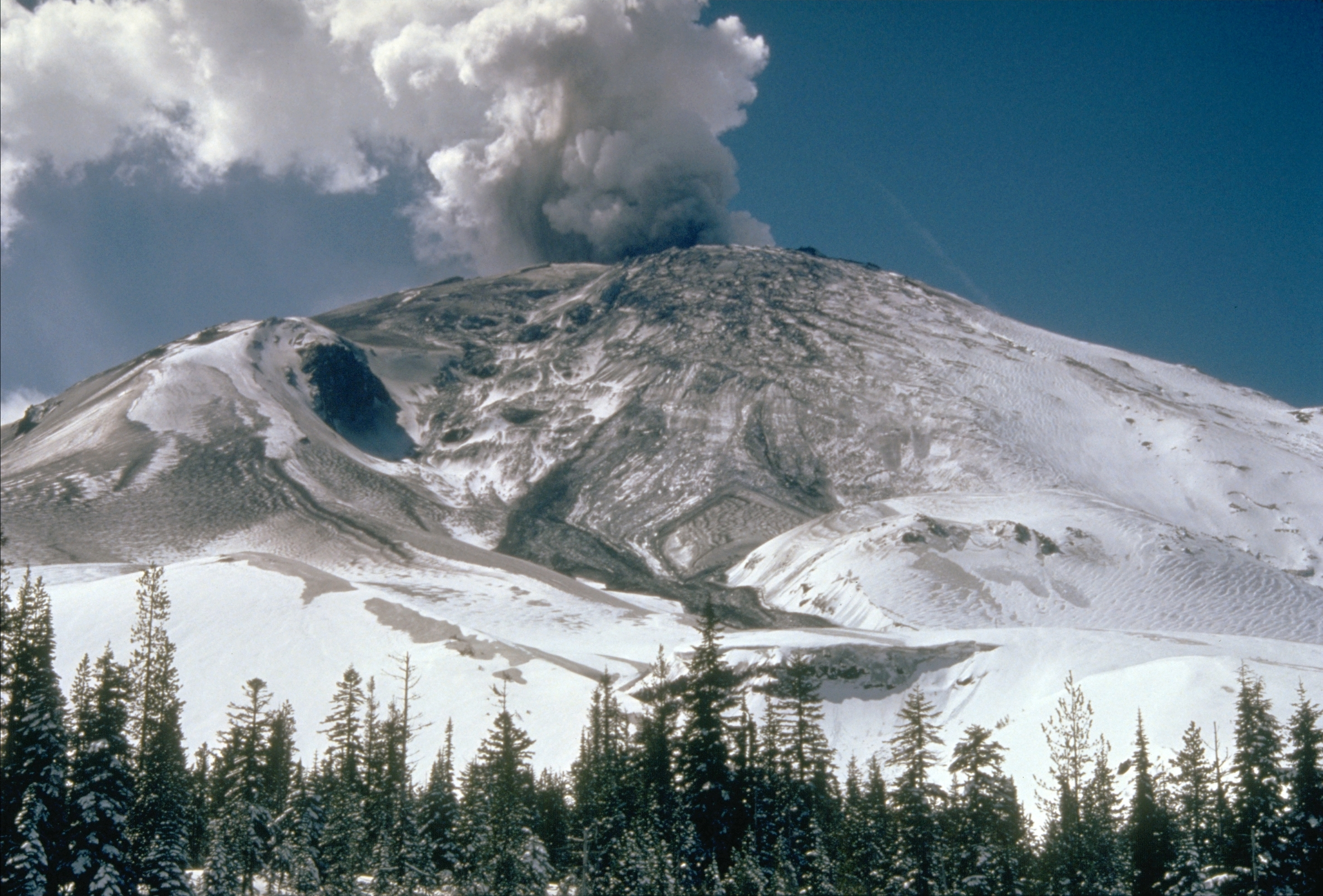
Early eruption of Mt. St. Helens

For a long period, Tacoma had large smelters where gold, silver, copper, and lead ores were treated. Seattle was the primary port for trade with Alaska and the rest of the country, and for a time, it possessed a large shipbuilding industry. The region around eastern Puget Sound developed heavy industry during the period including World War I and World War II, and the Boeing company became an established icon in the area.

During the Great Depression, a series of hydroelectric dams were constructed along the Columbia River as part of a project to increase the production of electricity. This culminated in 1941 with the completion of the Grand Coulee Dam, the largest concrete structure in the United States and the largest dam in the world at its construction.

During World War II, the state became a focus for war industries. While the Boeing Company produced many heavy bombers, ports in Seattle, Bremerton, Vancouver, and Tacoma were available for the manufacture of warships. Seattle was the point of departure for many soldiers in the Pacific, several of whom were quartered at Fort Lawton, which later became Discovery Park. In Eastern Washington, the Hanford Works atomic energy plant was opened in 1943 and played a major role in the construction of atomic bombs.

After the end of World War II, and with the beginning of the civil rights movement, the state's growing Black or African-American population's wages were 53% above the national average. The early diversification of Washington through the Great Migration led to successful efforts at reducing discrimination in the workplace. In 1950, Seattle's first black representative for the state's legislature was elected. At the 1970 U.S. census, the black population grew to 7.13% of the total population.

In 1970, the state was one of only four U.S. states to have been providing legal abortions before the 1973 Supreme Court decision in Roe v. Wade which loosened abortion laws nationwide.

On May 18, 1980, following a period of heavy tremors and small eruptions, the north face of Mount St. Helens slid off in the largest landslide in recorded history before erupting violently, destroying a large part of the top of the volcano. The eruption flattened the forest up to 12 mi (20 km) north of the volcano, killed 57 people, flooded the Columbia River and its tributaries with ash and mud, and blanketed large parts of Washington eastward and other surrounding states in ash, making day look like night.

== Geography ==
Major cities in Washington
A physical map of Washington with the cities of Bellingham, Everett, Seattle, Tacoma, Olympia, Vancouver, Spokane, Yakima, and Kennewick pinned.

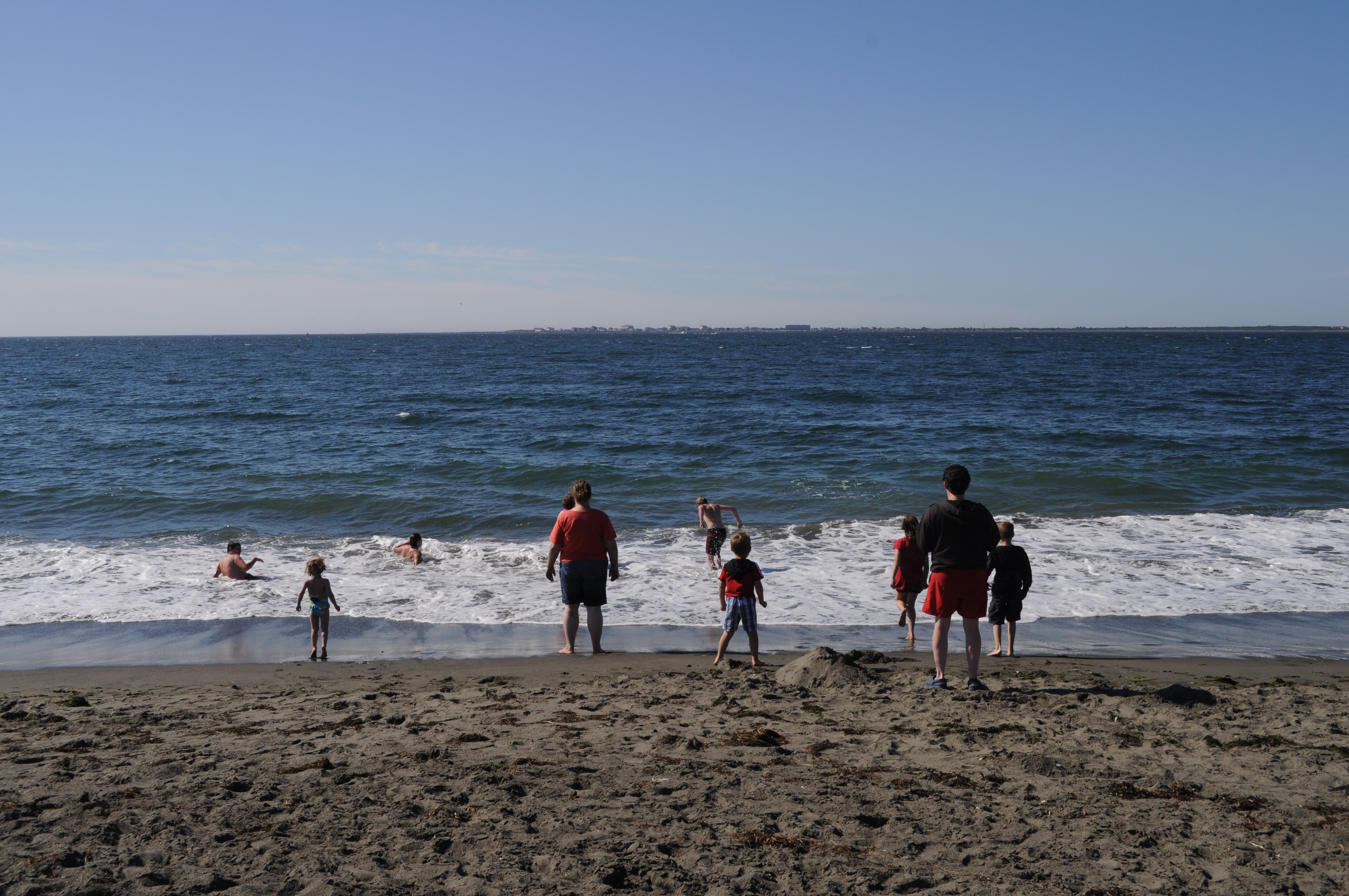
The Pacific coast of Westport

Washington is the northwesternmost state of the contiguous United States. It borders Idaho to the east, bounded mostly by the meridian running north from the confluence of the Snake River and Clearwater River (about 117°02'23" west), except for the southernmost section where the border follows the Snake River. Oregon is to the south, with the Columbia River forming the western part and the 46th parallel forming the eastern part of the Oregon–Washington border. During Washington's partition from Oregon, the original plan for the border followed the Columbia River east until the confluence with the Snake, and then would have followed the Snake River east. This was changed to keep Walla Walla's fertile farmland in Washington.

To the west of Washington lies the Pacific Ocean. Its northern border lies mostly along the 49th parallel, and then via marine boundaries through the Strait of Georgia, Haro Strait, and Strait of Juan de Fuca, with the Canadian province of British Columbia to the north.

Washington is part of a region known as the Pacific Northwest, a term which always refers to at least Washington and Oregon, and may or may not include some or all the following, depending on the user's intent: Idaho, western Montana, northern California, British Columbia, and Alaska.

The high mountains of the Cascade Range run north–south, bisecting the state. In addition to Western Washington and Eastern Washington, residents call the two parts of the state the "Westside" and the "Eastside", "Wet side" and "Dry side", or "Timberland" and "Wheatland", the latter pair more commonly in the names of region-specific businesses and institutions. These terms reflect the geography, climate, and industry of the land on both sides of the Cascades.

=== Western Washington ===
Major volcanoes in Washington
A physical map of Washington with the volcanic peaks Mount Baker, Glacier Peak, Mount Rainier, Mount Adams, and Mount St Helens pinned.

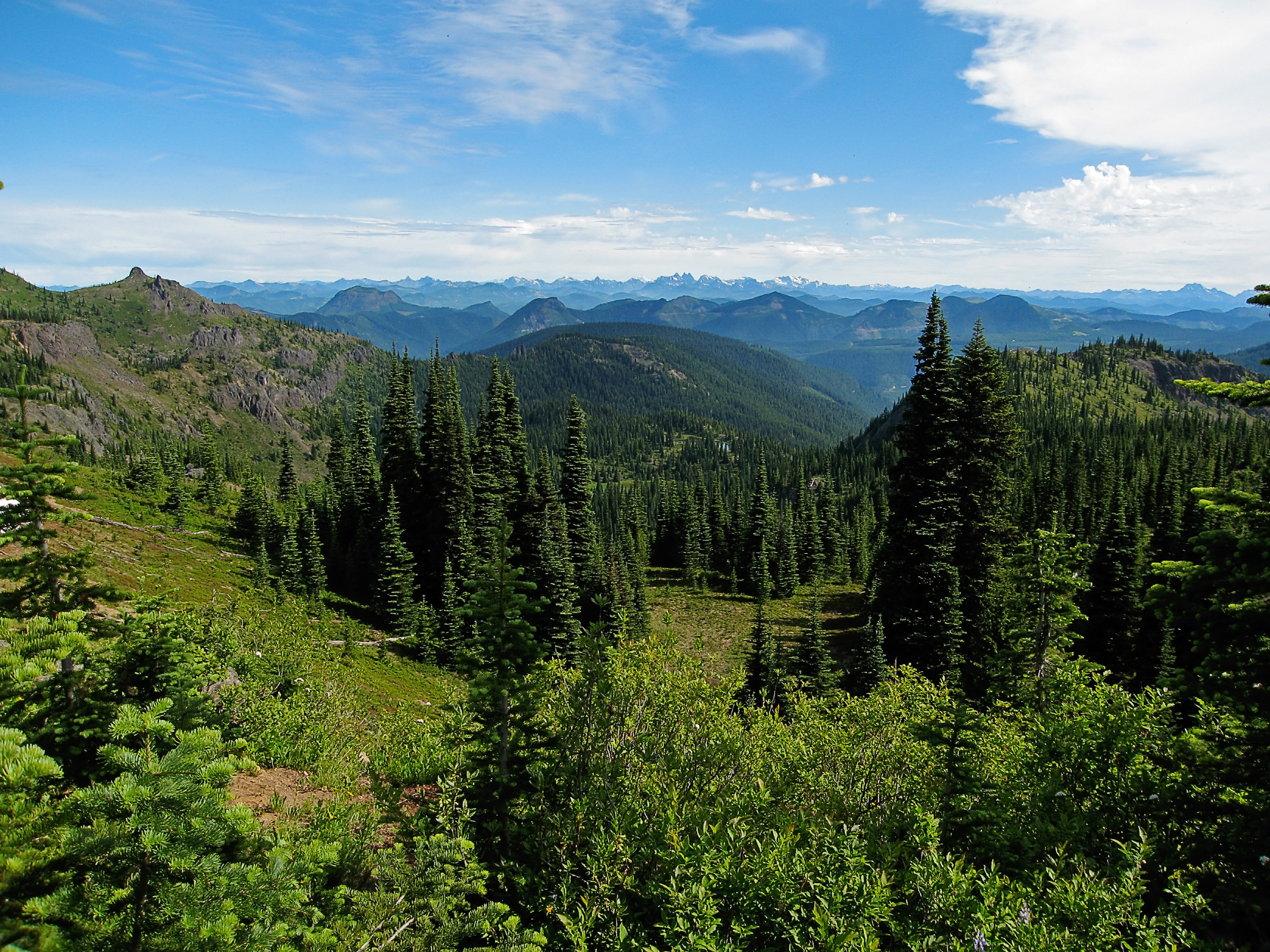
Mount Baker–Snoqualmie National Forest

From the Cascade Mountains westward, Western Washington has a mostly Mediterranean climate, with mild temperatures and wet winters, autumns and springs, and relatively dry summers. The Cascade Range has several volcanoes, which reach altitudes significantly higher than the rest of the mountains. From north to south, these major volcanoes are Mount Baker, Glacier Peak, Mount Rainier, Mount St. Helens, and Mount Adams. All are active volcanoes.

Mount Rainier—the tallest mountain in the state—is 50 miles (80 km) south of the city of Seattle, from which it is prominently visible. The United States Geological Survey considers 14,400-foot-tall (4,389 m) Mount Rainier the most dangerous volcano in the Cascade Range, due to its proximity to the Seattle metropolitan area, and most dangerous in the continental U.S. according to the Decade Volcanoes list. It is also covered with more glacial ice than any other peak in the contiguous 48 states.

Western Washington also is home of the Olympic Mountains, far west on the Olympic Peninsula, which support dense forests of conifers and areas of temperate rainforest. These deep forests, such as the Hoh Rainforest, are among the only rainforests in the continental United States. While Western Washington does not always experience a high amount of rainfall as measured in total inches of rain per year, it does consistently have more rainy days per year than most other places in the country.

=== Eastern Washington ===
Southeastern Washington

Eastern Washington—the part of the state east of the Cascades—has a relatively dry climate, in distinct contrast to the west side. It includes large areas of semiarid steppe and a few truly arid deserts in the rain shadow of the Cascades; the Hanford reservation receives an average annual precipitation of 6 to 7 inches (150 to 180 mm). Despite the limited amount of rainfall, agriculture is an extremely important business throughout much of Eastern Washington, as the soil is highly productive and irrigation, aided by dams along the Columbia River, is fairly widespread. The spread of population in Eastern Washington is dominated by access to water, especially rivers. The main cities are all located alongside rivers or lakes; most of them are named after the river or lake they adjoin.

Farther east, the climate becomes less arid, with annual rainfall increasing as one goes east to 21.2 inches (540 mm) in Pullman, near the Washington–Idaho border. The Okanogan Highlands and the rugged Kettle River Range and Selkirk Mountains cover much of the state's northeastern quadrant. The Palouse southeast region of Washington was grassland that has been mostly converted into farmland, and extends to the Blue Mountains.

=== Climate ===
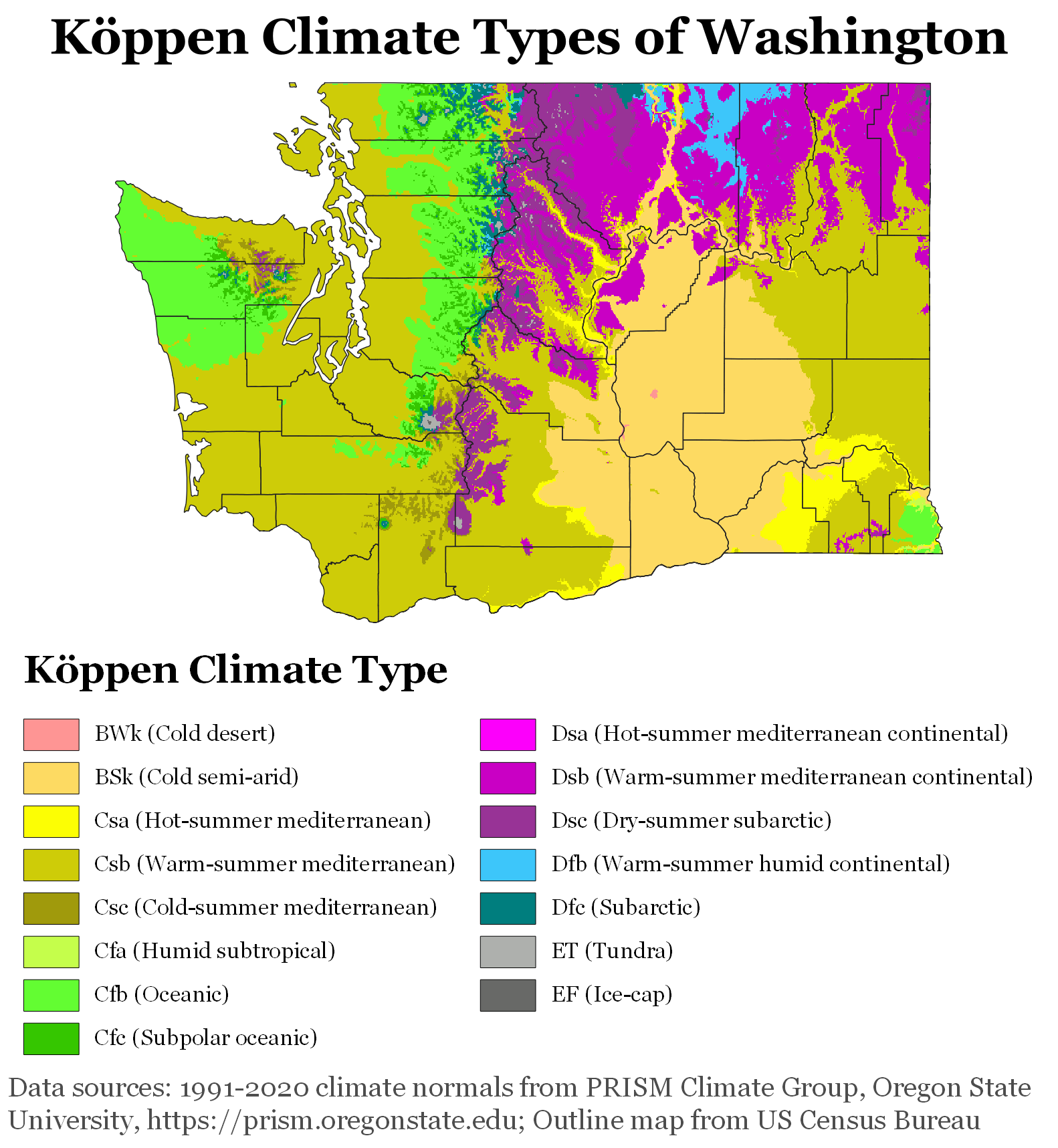
Köppen climate types of Washington, using 1991–2020 climate normals.

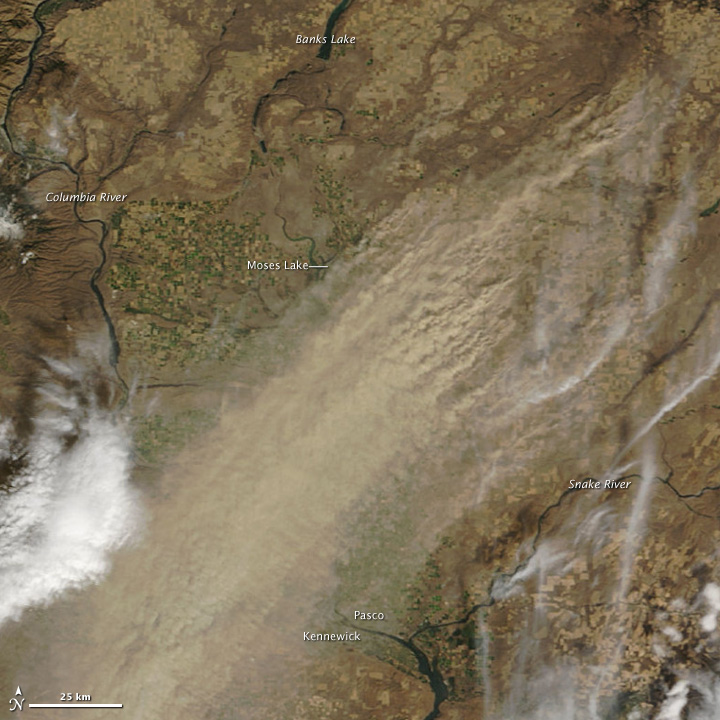
Dryland farming caused a large dust storm in arid parts of Eastern Washington on October 4, 2009. Courtesy: NASA/GSFC, MODIS Rapid Response.

The state of Washington has a temperate climate. The eastern half of Washington has a semi-arid to warm-summer mediterranean climate. The western side of Washington and the coastal areas of the state have a cool oceanic climate or warm-summer mediterranean climate. Major factors determining Washington's climate include the large semi-permanent low pressure and high pressure systems of the north Pacific Ocean, the continental air masses of North America, and the Olympic and Cascade mountains. In the spring and summer, a high-pressure anticyclone system dominates the north Pacific Ocean, causing air to spiral out in a clockwise fashion. For Washington, this means prevailing winds from the northwest bring relatively cool air and a predictably dry season.

In the autumn and winter, a low-pressure cyclone system, the Aleutian Low, takes over in the north Pacific Ocean. The air spiraling inward in a counter-clockwise fashion causes Washington's prevailing winds to come from the southwest, and bring cool and overcast weather and a predictably wet season. The term "Pineapple Express" is used colloquially to describe atmospheric river events, where repeated storm systems are directed by this persistent cyclone from the tropical Pacific regions a great distance into the Pacific Northwest. Western Washington is very cloudy during much of fall, winter, and early spring. Seattle averages the fewest sunshine hours of any major city in the United States.

Despite Western Washington's marine climate similar to many coastal cities of Europe, there are exceptions such as the "Big Snow" events of 1880, 1881, 1893, and 1916, and the "deep freeze" winters of 1883–1884, 1915–1916, 1949–1950, and 1955–1956, among others. During these events, Western Washington had up to 6 feet (1.8 m) of snow, sub-zero (−18 °C) temperatures, three months with snow on the ground, and lakes and rivers frozen over for weeks. Seattle's lowest officially recorded temperature is 0 °F (−18 °C) set on January 31, 1950, but low-altitude areas approximately three hours away from Seattle have recorded lows as cold as −48 °F (−44 °C).

The Southern Oscillation greatly influences weather during the cold season. During the El Niño phase, the jet stream enters the U.S. farther south through California, therefore late fall and winter are drier than normal with less snowpack. The La Niña phase reinforces the jet stream through the Pacific Northwest, causing Washington to have more rain and snow than average.

In 2006, the Climate Impacts Group at the University of Washington published The Impacts of Climate Change in Washington's Economy, a preliminary assessment of the risks and opportunities presented given the possibility of a rise in global temperatures and their effects on Washington state.

==== Rain shadow effects ====
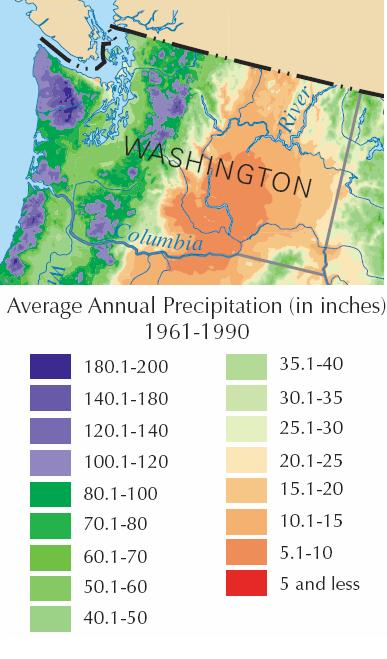
Washington has extensive variation in rainfall.

Rainfall in Washington varies dramatically going from east to west. The Olympic Peninsula's western side receives as much as 160 inches (4,100 mm) of precipitation annually, making it the wettest area of the 48 conterminous states and a temperate rainforest. Weeks may pass without a clear day. The western slopes of the Cascade Range receive some of the heaviest annual snowfall in the country, in some places more than 200 inches or 5,100 millimeters water equivalent. In the rain shadow area east of the Cascades, the annual precipitation is only 6 inches (150 mm). Precipitation then increases again eastward toward the Rocky Mountains, about 120 miles (190 km) east of the Idaho border.

The Olympic mountains and Cascades compound this climatic pattern by causing orographic lift of the air masses blown inland from the Pacific Ocean, resulting in the windward side of the mountains receiving high levels of precipitation and the leeward side receiving low levels. This occurs most dramatically around the Olympic Mountains and the Cascade Range. In both cases, the windward slopes facing southwest receive high precipitation and mild, cool temperatures.

The Puget Sound lowlands are known for clouds and rain in the winter. The western slopes of the Cascades receive larger amounts of precipitation, often falling as snow at higher elevations. Mount Baker, near the state's northern border, is one of the snowiest places in the world. In 1999, it set the world record for snowfall in a single season—1,140 inches (95 ft; 29 m).

East of the Cascades, a large region experiences strong rain shadow effects. Semi-arid conditions occur in much of Eastern Washington with the strongest rain shadow effects at the relatively low elevations of the central Columbia Plateau—especially the region just east of the Columbia River from about the Snake River to the Okanagan Highland. Thus, instead of rain forests, much of Eastern Washington is covered with dry grassland, shrub-steppe, and dunes.

==== Temperatures ====
The average annual temperature ranges from 51 °F (11 °C) on the Pacific coast, to 40 °F (4 °C) in the northeast. The lowest temperature recorded in the state was −48 °F (−44 °C) in Winthrop and Mazama. The highest recorded temperature in the state was 120 °F (49 °C) at Hanford on June 29, 2021. Both records were set east of the Cascades.

Western Washington is known for its mild climate, considerable fog, frequent cloud cover, long-lasting drizzles in the winter and warm, temperate summers. The eastern region, which does not benefit from the general moderating effect of the Pacific Ocean, occasionally experiences extreme climate. Arctic cold fronts in the winter and heat waves in the summer are not uncommon. In the Western region, temperatures have reached as high as 118 °F (48 °C) in Maple Valley during the June 2021 heat wave, and as low as −6 °F (−21 °C) in Longview, and even −8 °F (−22 °C) in Sammamish.

Climate data for Washington state (1895–2015)
| Month | Jan | Feb | Mar | Apr | May | Jun | Jul | Aug | Sep | Oct | Nov | Dec | Year |
|---|---|---|---|---|---|---|---|---|---|---|---|---|---|
| Record high °F (°C) | 74 (23) | 83 (28) | 95 (35) | 103 (39) | 107 (42) | 120 (49) | 118 (48) | 118 (48) | 111 (44) | 99 (37) | 83 (28) | 74 (23) | 120 (49) |
| Mean maximum °F (°C) | 60 (16) | 64 (18) | 73 (23) | 86 (30) | 94 (34) | 102 (39) | 109 (43) | 106 (41) | 98 (37) | 84 (29) | 67 (19) | 60 (16) | 112 (44) |
| Mean daily maximum °F (°C) | 34.8 (1.6) | 40.6 (4.8) | 47.7 (8.7) | 55.9 (13.3) | 63.6 (17.6) | 69.9 (21.1) | 78.0 (25.6) | 77.3 (25.2) | 69.4 (20.8) | 57.2 (14.0) | 43.2 (6.2) | 36.2 (2.3) | 56.2 (13.4) |
| Mean daily minimum °F (°C) | 23.0 (−5.0) | 26.0 (−3.3) | 29.6 (−1.3) | 34.2 (1.2) | 40.1 (4.5) | 45.7 (7.6) | 50.5 (10.3) | 50.0 (10.0) | 44.7 (7.1) | 37.2 (2.9) | 29.9 (−1.2) | 25.3 (−3.7) | 36.4 (2.4) |
| Mean minimum °F (°C) | −19 (−28) | −8 (−22) | −2 (−19) | 14 (−10) | 21 (−6) | 26 (−3) | 31 (−1) | 31 (−1) | 24 (−4) | 16 (−9) | 2 (−17) | −8 (−22) | −20 (−29) |
| Record low °F (°C) | −42 (−41) | −40 (−40) | −25 (−32) | −7 (−22) | 11 (−12) | 20 (−7) | 22 (−6) | 20 (−7) | 11 (−12) | −5 (−21) | −29 (−34) | −48 (−44) | −48 (−44) |
| Average precipitation inches (mm) | 6.08 (154) | 4.61 (117) | 4.23 (107) | 2.87 (73) | 2.31 (59) | 1.89 (48) | 0.85 (22) | 1.02 (26) | 1.93 (49) | 3.67 (93) | 6.22 (158) | 6.52 (166) | 42.2 (1,072) |
Source 1: "Office of the Washington State Climatologist". OWSC. Archived from the original on October 20, 2019.
Source 2: "Comparative Data for the Western States". WRCC. Archived from the original on July 29, 2016.

Average daily high and low temperatures in °F (°C) in cities and other locations in Washington colored and sortable by average temperature
| Place | Jan | Feb | Mar | Apr | May | Jun | Jul | Aug | Sep | Oct | Nov | Dec |
|---|---|---|---|---|---|---|---|---|---|---|---|---|
| Bellingham | 48 / 36 (9 / 2) | 50 / 36 (10 / 2) | 54 / 39 (12 / 4) | 59 / 42 (15 / 6) | 64 / 47 (18 / 8) | 69 / 51 (21 / 11) | 73 / 54 (23 / 12) | 74 / 54 (23 / 12) | 68 / 50 (20 / 10) | 59 / 45 (15 / 7) | 51 / 39 (11 / 4) | 46 / 35 (8 / 2) |
| Ephrata | 35 / 22 (2 / −6) | 43 / 26 (6 / −3) | 54 / 32 (12 / 0) | 63 / 38 (17 / 3) | 72 / 46 (22 / 8) | 80 / 54 (27 / 12) | 88 / 60 (31 / 16) | 87 / 59 (31 / 15) | 78 / 50 (26 / 10) | 62 / 39 (17 / 4) | 45 / 29 (7 / −2) | 34 / 21 (1 / −6) |
| Forks | 47 / 36 (8 / 2) | 49 / 35 (9 / 2) | 51 / 37 (11 / 3) | 55 / 39 (13 / 4) | 60 / 43 (16 / 6) | 63 / 48 (17 / 9) | 67 / 51 (19 / 11) | 69 / 51 (21 / 11) | 66 / 47 (19 / 8) | 58 / 42 (14 / 6) | 50 / 38 (10 / 3) | 46 / 35 (8 / 2) |
| Paradise | 35 / 23 (2 / −5) | 36 / 22 (2 / −6) | 38 / 24 (3 / −4) | 42 / 26 (6 / −3) | 49 / 32 (9 / 0) | 55 / 36 (13 / 2) | 63 / 43 (17 / 6) | 65 / 44 (18 / 7) | 58 / 40 (14 / 4) | 48 / 33 (9 / 1) | 37 / 25 (3 / −4) | 34 / 21 (1 / −6) |
| Richland | 41 / 29 (5 / −2) | 47 / 30 (8 / −1) | 58 / 35 (14 / 2) | 65 / 41 (18 / 5) | 73 / 48 (23 / 9) | 80 / 54 (27 / 12) | 88 / 59 (31 / 15) | 88 / 58 (31 / 14) | 78 / 50 (26 / 10) | 64 / 40 (18 / 4) | 49 / 34 (9 / 1) | 38 / 27 (3 / −3) |
| Seattle | 47 / 37 (8 / 3) | 50 / 37 (10 / 3) | 54 / 39 (12 / 4) | 59 / 42 (15 / 6) | 65 / 47 (18 / 8) | 70 / 52 (21 / 11) | 76 / 56 (24 / 13) | 76 / 56 (24 / 13) | 71 / 52 (22 / 11) | 60 / 46 (16 / 8) | 51 / 40 (11 / 4) | 46 / 36 (8 / 2) |
| Spokane | 35 / 24 (2 / −4) | 40 / 25 (4 / −4) | 49 / 31 (9 / −1) | 57 / 36 (14 / 2) | 67 / 43 (19 / 6) | 74 / 50 (23 / 10) | 83 / 55 (28 / 13) | 83 / 55 (28 / 13) | 73 / 46 (23 / 8) | 58 / 36 (14 / 2) | 42 / 29 (6 / −2) | 32 / 22 (0 / −6) |
| Vancouver | 47 / 33 (8 / 1) | 51 / 33 (11 / 1) | 56 / 37 (13 / 3) | 60 / 40 (16 / 4) | 67 / 45 (19 / 7) | 72 / 50 (22 / 10) | 78 / 54 (26 / 12) | 79 / 53 (26 / 12) | 75 / 48 (24 / 9) | 63 / 41 (17 / 5) | 52 / 37 (11 / 3) | 46 / 32 (8 / 0) |
| Winthrop | 31 / 15 (−1 / −9) | 39 / 18 (4 / −8) | 51 / 26 (11 / −3) | 62 / 32 (17 / 0) | 71 / 40 (22 / 4) | 78 / 46 (26 / 8) | 86 / 50 (30 / 10) | 86 / 49 (30 / 9) | 78 / 41 (26 / 5) | 62 / 32 (17 / 0) | 42 / 25 (6 / −4) | 29 / 14 (−2 / −10) |
| Yakima | 39 / 23 (4 / −5) | 46 / 26 (8 / −3) | 56 / 30 (13 / −1) | 64 / 34 (18 / 1) | 72 / 42 (22 / 6) | 80 / 48 (27 / 9) | 88 / 53 (31 / 12) | 87 / 52 (31 / 11) | 78 / 44 (26 / 7) | 64 / 34 (18 / 1) | 48 / 27 (9 / −3) | 36 / 21 (2 / −6) |

=== Flora and fauna ===
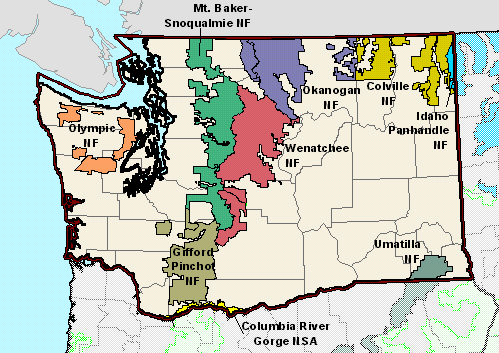
Washington's national forests

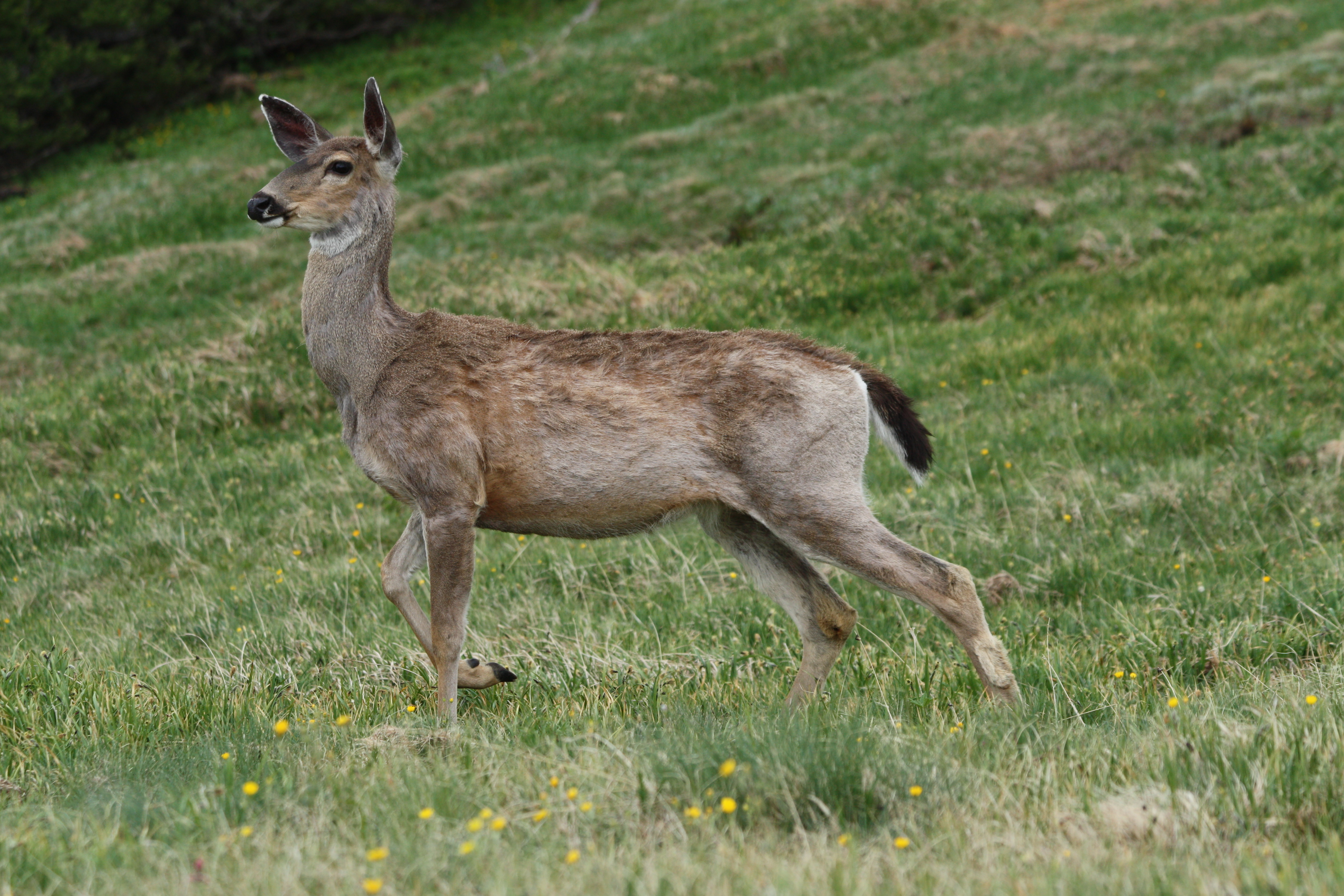
Black-tailed deer graze at Deer Park in Olympic National Park

Forests cover about half the state's land area, mostly west of the northern Cascades. Approximately two-thirds of Washington's forested area is publicly owned, including 64 percent of federal land. Common trees and plants in the region are camas, Douglas fir, hemlock, penstemon, ponderosa pine, western red cedar, and many species of ferns. The state's areas of wilderness offer sanctuary, with substantially large populations of shorebirds and marine mammals. The Pacific shore surrounding the San Juan Islands is heavily inhabited by killer, gray, and humpback whales.

In Eastern Washington, the flora is vastly different. Tumbleweeds and sagebrush dominate the landscape throughout large parts of the countryside. Russian olives and other trees are common alongside riverbanks. Apart from the riversides, large swaths of Eastern Washington have no naturally existing trees at all, though many trees have been planted and are irrigated by people. A wider variety of flora can be found in both the Blue Mountains and the eastern sides of the Cascades.

Mammals native to the state include the bat, black bear, bobcat, cougar, coyote, deer, elk, gray wolf, hare, moose, mountain beaver, muskrat, opossum, pocket gopher, rabbit, raccoon, river otter, skunk, and tree squirrel. Because of the wide range of geography, the state of Washington is home to several different ecoregions, which allow for a varied range of bird species. This range includes raptors, shorebirds, woodland birds, grassland birds, ducks, and others. There have also been a large number of species introduced to Washington, dating back to the early 18th century, including horses and burros.

The channel catfish, lamprey, and sturgeon are among the 400 known freshwater fishes. Along with the Cascades frog, there are several forms of snakes that define the most prominent reptiles and amphibians. Coastal bays and islands are often inhabited by plentiful amounts of shellfish and whales. There are five species of salmon that ascend the Western Washington area, from streams to spawn.

Washington has a variety of National Park Service units. Among these are the Alta Lake State Park, Lake Roosevelt National Recreation Area, San Juan Islands National Wildlife Refuge, as well as three national parks—the Olympic National Park, North Cascades National Park, and Mount Rainier National Park. The three national parks were established between 1899 and 1968. Almost 95 percent (876,517 acres, 354,714 hectares, 3,547.14 square kilometers) of Olympic National Park's area has been designated as wilderness under the National Wilderness Preservation System.

There are 143 state parks and 9 national forests, run by the Washington State Park System and the United States Forest Service. The Okanogan National Forest is the largest national forest on the West Coast, encompassing 1,499,023 acres (606,633 ha). It is managed together as the Okanogan–Wenatchee National Forest, encompassing a considerably larger area of around 3,239,404 acres (1,310,940 ha).

=== Administrative divisions ===
There are 39 counties within Washington, and 281 incorporated municipalities which are divided into cities and towns. The majority of the state's population lives within Western Washington, in the Seattle metropolitan area. The city of Seattle is the principal city of the metropolitan area, and Western Washington, with a 2020 census population of 737,015.

Largest cities or towns in Washington Source:
| Rank | Name | County | Pop. |
|---|---|---|---|
| 1 | Seattle | King | 737,015 |
| 2 | Spokane | Spokane | 228,989 |
| 3 | Tacoma | Pierce | 219,346 |
| 4 | Vancouver | Clark | 190,915 |
| 5 | Bellevue | King | 151,854 |
| 6 | Kent | King | 136,588 |
| 7 | Everett | Snohomish | 110,629 |
| 8 | Renton | King | 106,785 |
| 9 | Spokane Valley | Spokane | 102,976 |
| 10 | Federal Way | King | 101,030 |

== Demographics ==
Historical population
| Census | Pop. | Note | %± |
|---|---|---|---|
| 1850 | 1,201 | | — |
| 1860 | 11,594 | | 865.4% |
| 1870 | 23,955 | | 106.6% |
| 1880 | 75,116 | | 213.6% |
| 1890 | 357,232 | | 375.6% |
| 1900 | 518,103 | | 45.0% |
| 1910 | 1,141,990 | | 120.4% |
| 1920 | 1,356,621 | | 18.8% |
| 1930 | 1,563,396 | | 15.2% |
| 1940 | 1,736,191 | | 11.1% |
| 1950 | 2,378,963 | | 37.0% |
| 1960 | 2,853,214 | | 19.9% |
| 1970 | 3,409,169 | | 19.5% |
| 1980 | 4,132,156 | | 21.2% |
| 1990 | 4,866,692 | | 17.8% |
| 2000 | 5,894,121 | | 21.1% |
| 2010 | 6,724,540 | | 14.1% |
| 2020 | 7,705,281 | | 14.6% |
| 2025 (est.) | 8,001,020 | | 3.8% |
Source: 1910–2020

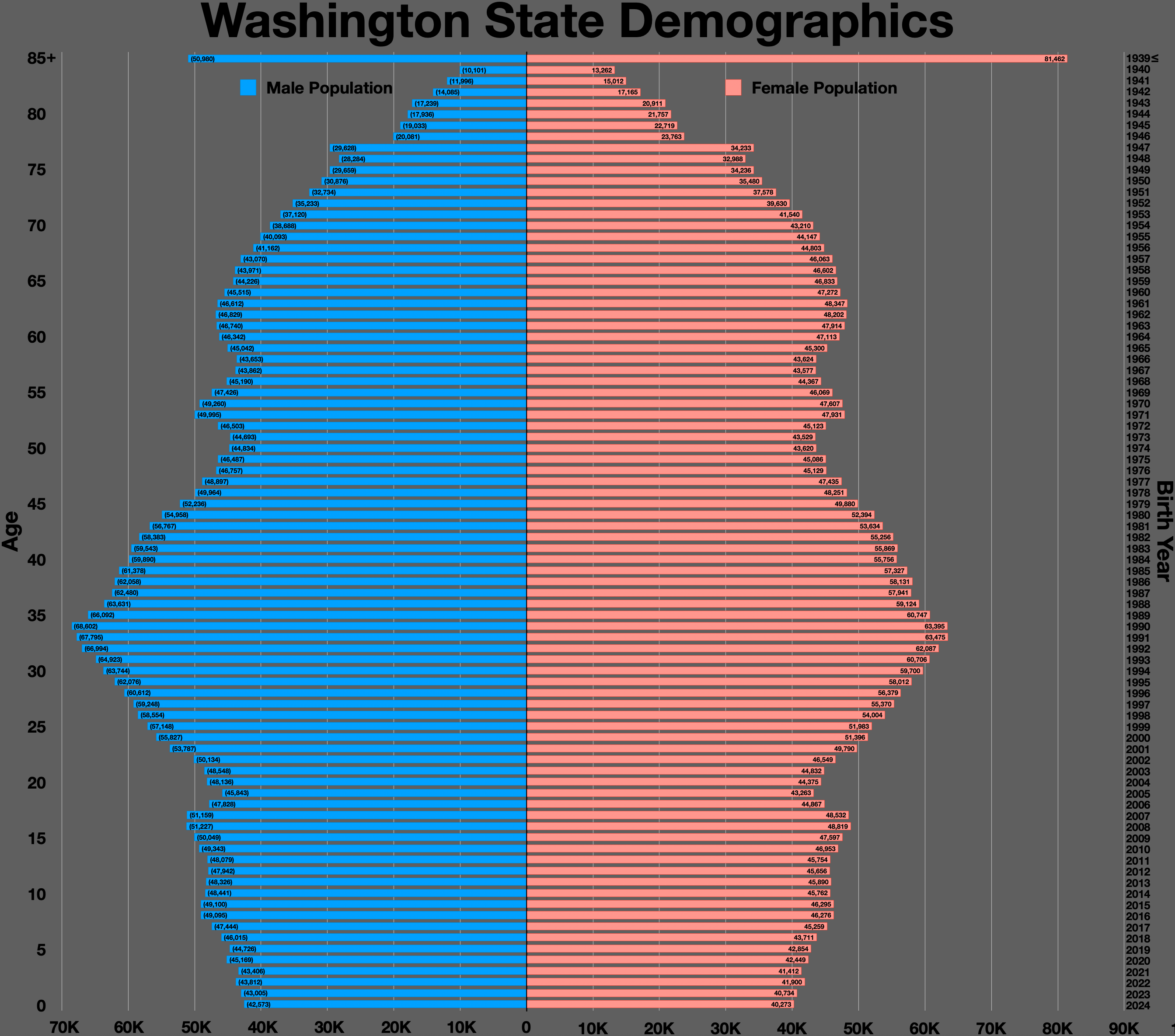
Washington State population pyramid

=== Population ===
Washington's population was 7,705,281 in the 2020 census, a 14.6% increase since the 2010 census. In 2020, the state ranked 13th overall in population, and was the third most populous, after California and Texas, west of the Mississippi River. Washington has the largest population and highest population density among states in the Pacific Northwest, followed by Oregon and Idaho. The Washington State Office of Financial Management estimated the state population to be 8,115,100 as of April 1, 2025.

The Seattle–Tacoma–Bellevue metropolitan area's population was 4,018,762 in the 2020 census, more than half the state total. The center of population of Washington in 2010 was at 47.33°N 121.62°W, in an unpopulated part of the Cascade Mountains in rural eastern King County, southeast of North Bend, northeast of Enumclaw, and west of Snoqualmie Pass.

In 2020, Washington's proportion of residents under the age of five was 5.7%, 21.8% under 18, and 16.3% 65 or older.

According to HUD's 2022 Annual Homeless Assessment Report, there were an estimated 25,211 homeless people in Washington. Data from a 2023 study was released by the Washington State Office of Superintendent of Public Instruction (OSPI) which recorded 42,436 students in the state as meeting a variety of definitions to be described as homeless, affecting 3.8% of the student population. A 2022-2023 report undertaken by a national, homeless advocacy group known as Schoolhouse Connections, listed 13,876 babies and toddlers as experiencing a form of homelessness, or approximately above 4% of the state's population in the age group.

Four-fifths of the state's population identifies as White or European American. Washington has some of the largest Native American and Asian populations among states in the U.S.; the state also has a small proportion of African Americans. Washington's Hispanic community began growing rapidly in the late 20th century. In 2018, the top countries of origin for Washington's immigrants were Mexico, India, China, the Philippines and Vietnam. There are 29 federally recognized Native American tribes in the state, mostly in Western Washington, and other unrecognized groups.

The racial composition of Washington's population as of the 2020 census was:

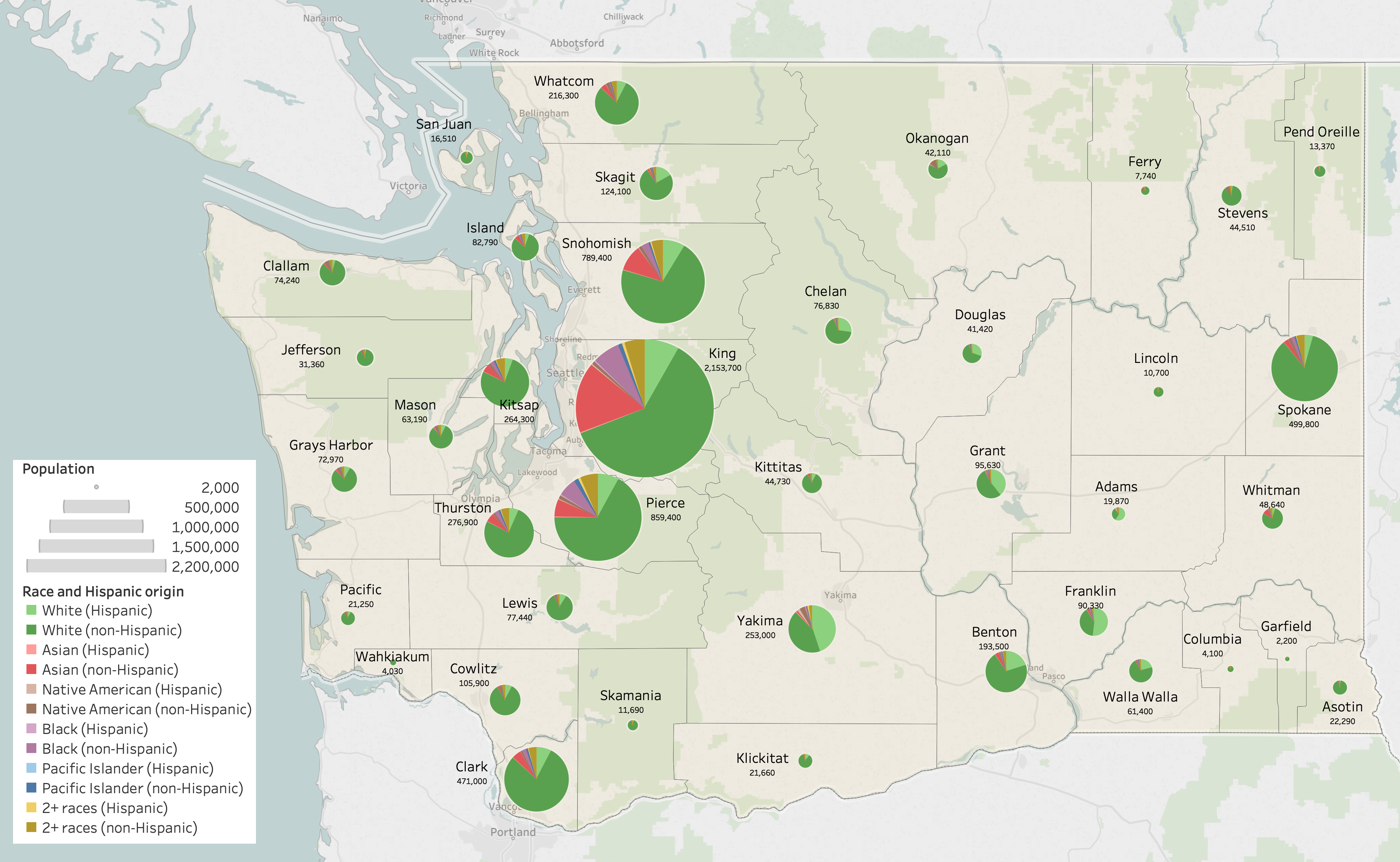
Race and Hispanic origin of Washington by county, showing race by color, and then breaking down non-Hispanic and Hispanic origin by color tone. The county population is shown by size and by the label. The same data on the map below shows non-Hispanic and Hispanic origin first and then breaks that down by race using color tone.

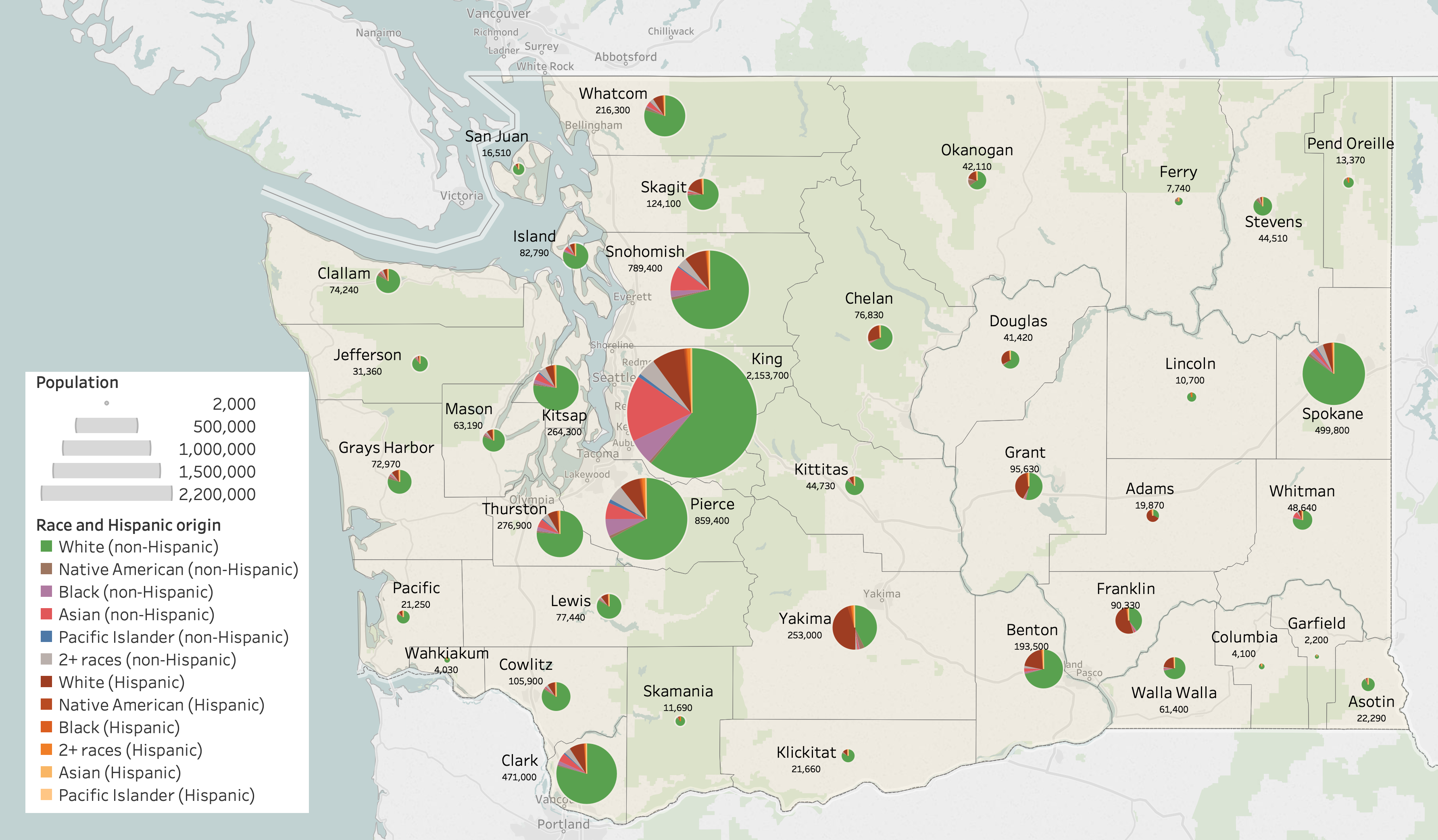
The same race and origin data as above, but the Hispanic origin is grouped first, then by race. The first emphasizes the racial diversity of people of Hispanic origin, while the second grouping gives a clearer indication of the total Hispanic population.

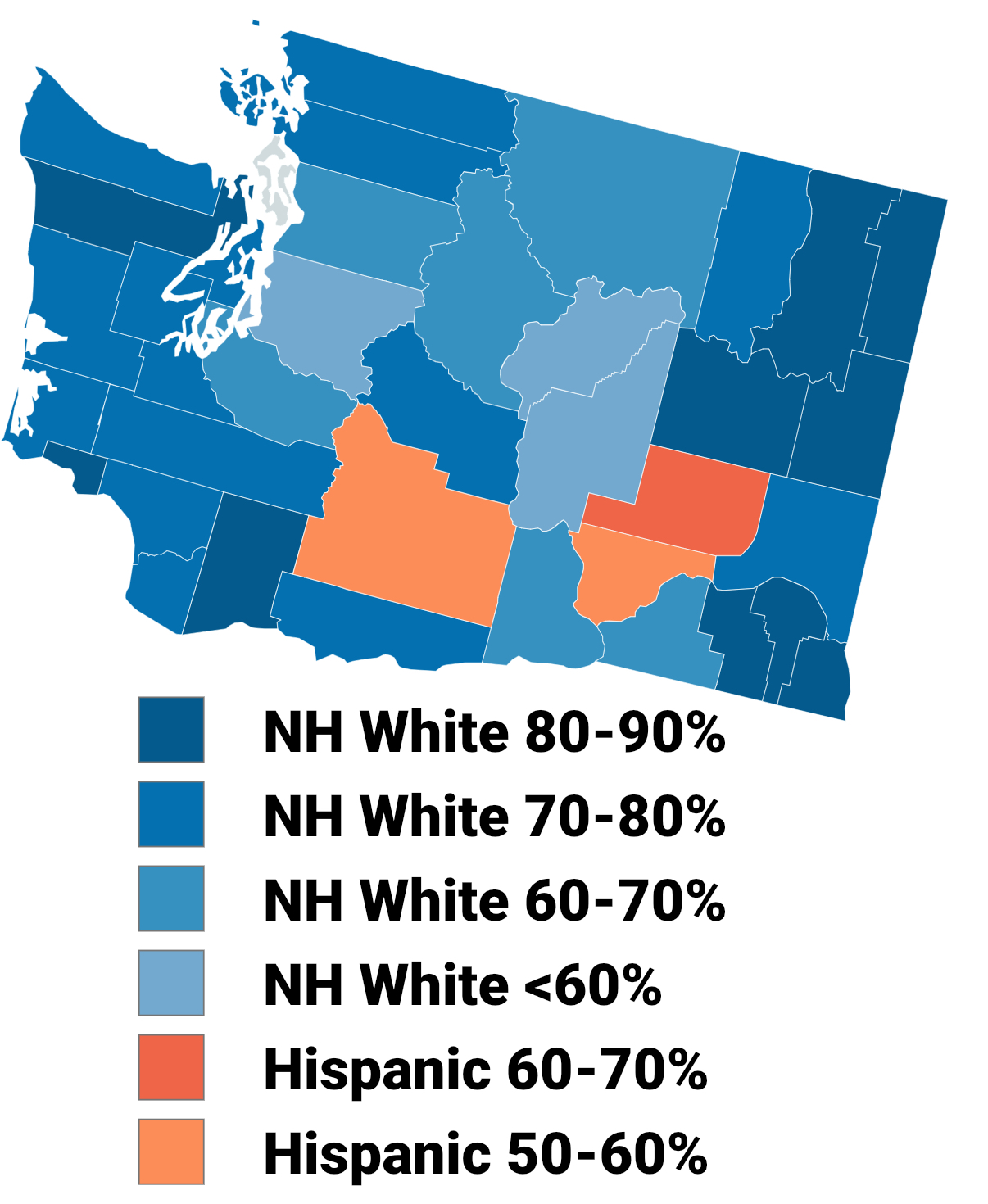
A map of counties in Washington state by racial and ethnic plurality, per the 2020 U.S. census

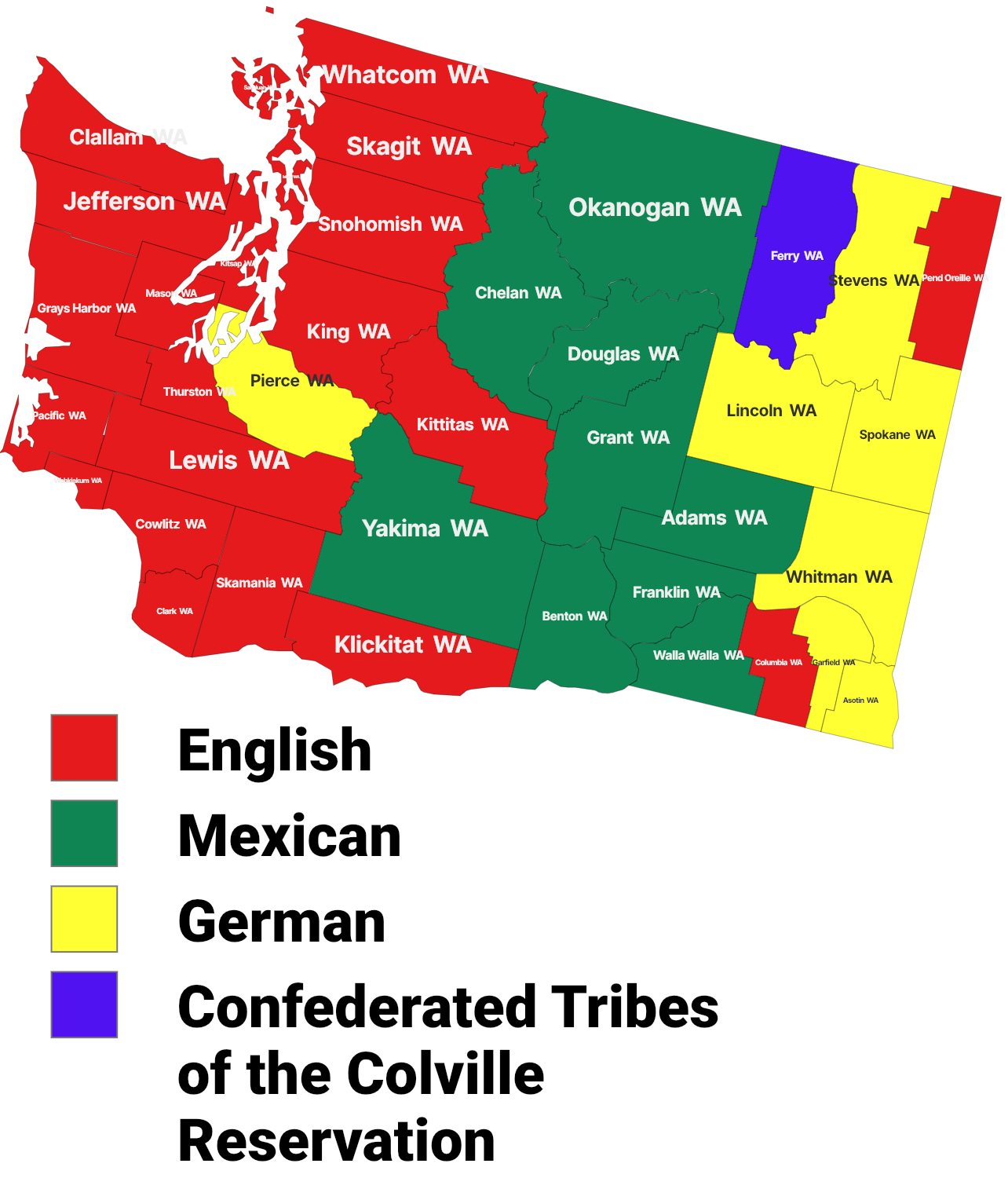
The largest alone or in any combination ethnic origin by county in Washington (state), per the 2020 census

Ethnic composition as of the 2020 census
| Race and ethnicity | Alone | Total |
|---|---|---|
| White (non-Hispanic) | 63.8% | 70.0% |
| Hispanic or Latino (Note: Persons of Hispanic or Latino origin are not distinguished between total and partial ancestry.) | — | 13.7% |
| Asian | 9.4% | 11.8% |
| African American (non-Hispanic) | 3.8% | 5.3% |
| Native American | 1.2% | 3.2% |
| Pacific Islander | 0.8% | 1.4% |
| Other | 0.6% | 1.7% |

Washington historical racial composition
| Racial composition | 1990 | 2000 | 2010 | 2020 |
|---|---|---|---|---|
| White | 88.5% | 81.8% | 77.3% | 66.6% |
| Asian | 4.3% | 5.5% | 7.2% | 9.5% |
| Black or African American | 3.1% | 3.2% | 3.6% | 4.0% |
| American Indian and Alaska Native | 1.7% | 1.6% | 1.5% | 1.6% |
| Native Hawaiian and Other Pacific Islander | – | 0.4% | 0.6% | 0.8% |
| Other race | 2.4% | 3.9% | 5.2% | 6.7% |
| Two or more races | – | 3.6% | 4.7% | 10.9% |

Washington (state) – Racial and ethnic composition Note: the US Census treats Hispanic/Latino as an ethnic category. This table excludes Latinos from the racial categories and assigns them to a separate category. Hispanics/Latinos may be of any race.
| Race / Ethnicity (NH = Non-Hispanic) | Pop 2000 | Pop 2010 | Pop 2020 | % 2000 | % 2010 | % 2020 |
|---|---|---|---|---|---|---|
| White alone (NH) | 4,652,490 | 4,876,804 | 4,918,820 | 78.93% | 72.52% | 63.84% |
| Black or African American alone (NH) | 184,631 | 229,603 | 296,170 | 3.13% | 3.41% | 3.84% |
| Native American or Alaska Native alone (NH) | 85,396 | 88,735 | 91,191 | 1.45% | 1.32% | 1.18% |
| Asian alone (NH) | 319,401 | 475,634 | 723,062 | 5.42% | 7.07% | 9.38% |
| Pacific Islander alone (NH) | 22,779 | 38,783 | 62,490 | 0.39% | 0.58% | 0.81% |
| Other race alone (NH) | 11,989 | 11,838 | 43,221 | 0.20% | 0.18% | 0.56% |
| Mixed race or Multiracial (NH) | 175,926 | 247,353 | 511,114 | 2.98% | 3.68% | 6.63% |
| Hispanic or Latino (any race) | 441,509 | 755,790 | 1,059,213 | 7.49% | 11.24% | 13.75% |
| Total | 5,894,121 | 6,724,540 | 7,705,281 | 100.00% | 100.00% | 100.00% |

In the 2016 American Community Survey, 12.1% of Washington's population were of Hispanic or Latino origin (of any race): Mexican (9.7%), Puerto Rican (0.4%), Cuban (0.1%), and other Hispanic or Latino origin (1.8%). The five largest ancestry groups were: German (17.8%), Irish (10.8%), English (10.4%), Norwegian (5.4%), and American (4.6%).

Birth data

In 2011, 44.3 percent of Washington's population younger than age 1 were minorities.

Note: Births in table do not add up because Hispanics are counted both by their ethnicity and by their race, giving a higher overall number.

Live births by single race or ethnicity of the mother
| Race | 2014 | 2015 | 2016 | 2017 | 2018 | 2019 | 2020 | 2021 | 2022 | 2023 | 2024 |
|---|---|---|---|---|---|---|---|---|---|---|---|
| Non-Hispanic White | 55,872 (63.1%) | 55,352 (62.2%) | 53,320 (58.9%) | 50,679 (57.9%) | 49,019 (56.9%) | 47,435 (55.9%) | 46,199 (55.6%) | 46,187 (55.0%) | 44,084 (52.9%) | 42,237 (52.2%) | 42,258 (50.8%) |
| Asian | 10,306 (11.6%) | 10,611 (11.9%) | 8,875 (9.8%) | 8,836 (10.1%) | 8,729 (10.1%) | 8,856 (10.4%) | 8,429 (10.1%) | 8,817 (10.5%) | 9,159 (11.0%) | 9,032 (11.1%) | 9,587 (11.5%) |
| Black | 5,254 (5.9%) | 5,302 (6.0%) | 3,862 (4.3%) | 3,944 (4.5%) | 3,922 (4.6%) | 3,813 (4.5%) | 3,841 (4.6%) | 3,698 (4.4%) | 3,797 (4.6%) | 3,653 (4.5%) | 3,780 (4.5%) |
| Pacific Islander | ... | ... | 1,183 (1.3%) | 1,164 (1.3%) | 1,159 (1.3%) | 1,204 (1.4%) | 1,231 (1.5%) | 1,181 (1.4%) | 1,284 (1.5%) | 1,348 (1.7%) | 1,357 (1.6%) |
| American Indian | 2,059 (2.3%) | 2,036 (2.3%) | 1,309 (1.4%) | 1,112 (1.3%) | 1,166 (1.4%) | 1,018 (1.2%) | 1,002 (1.2%) | 928 (1.1%) | 861 (1.0%) | 828 (1.0%) | 868 (1.0%) |
| Hispanic (any race) | 15,779 (17.8%) | 16,073 (18.1%) | 16,533 (18.3%) | 15,973 (18.2%) | 16,073 (18.7%) | 16,161 (19.0%) | 16,020 (19.3%) | 16,260 (19.4%) | 17,190 (20.6%) | 17,145 (21.2%) | 18,140 (21.8%) |
| Total | 88,585 (100%) | 88,990 (100%) | 90,505 (100%) | 87,562 (100%) | 86,085 (100%) | 84,895 (100%) | 83,086 (100%) | 83,911 (100%) | 83,333 (100%) | 80,932 (100%) | 83,118 (100%) |

- Since 2016, data for births of White Hispanic origin are not collected, but included in one Hispanic group; persons of Hispanic origin may be of any race.

=== Areas of concentration ===
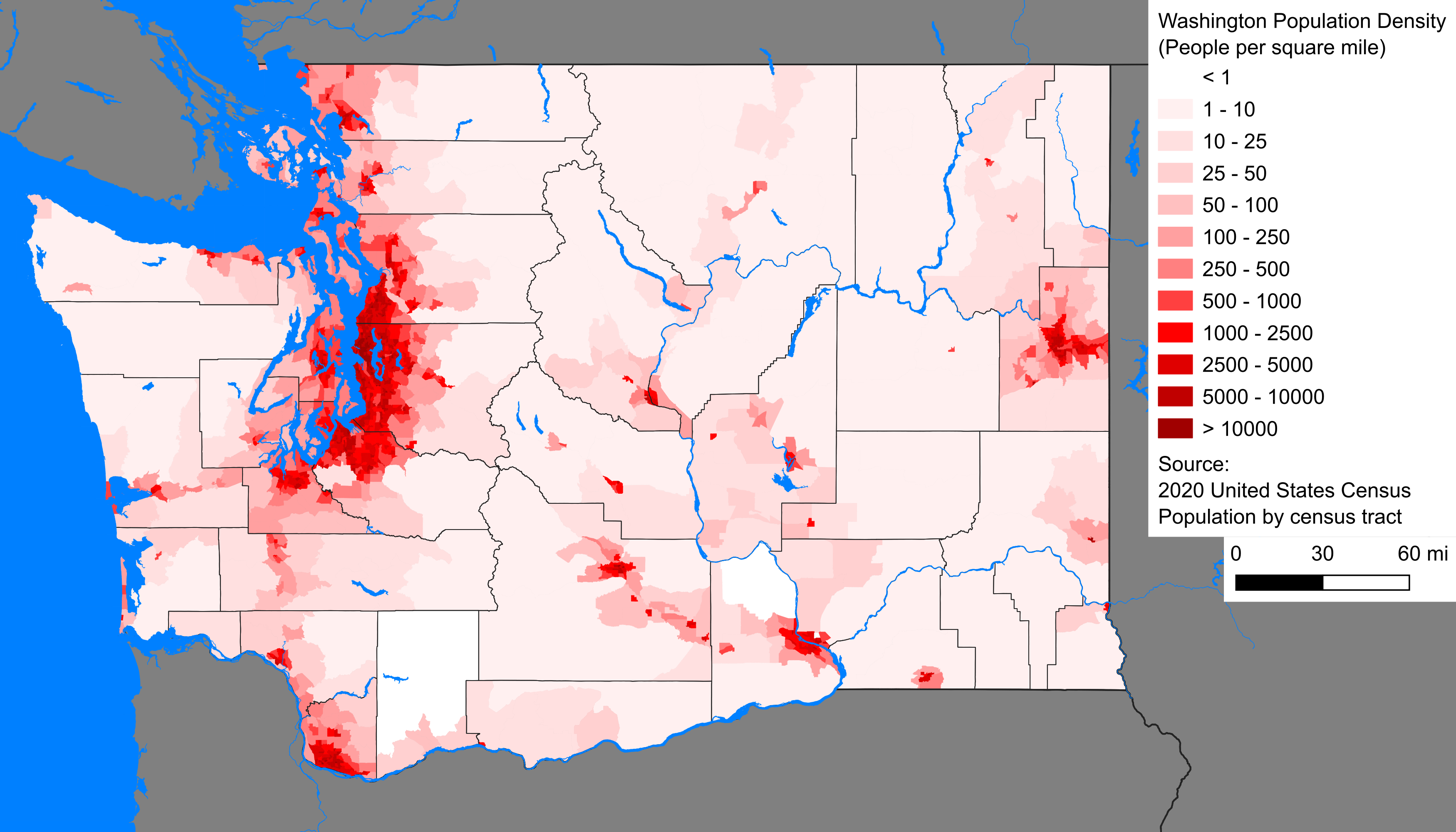
Washington population density map

African Americans in the Pacific Northwest are underrepresented relative to the U.S.'s total population. Washington's Black population is concentrated in the South End and Central District areas of Seattle, and in inner Tacoma. The Black community of Seattle consisted of one individual in 1858, Manuel Lopes, and grew to a population of 406 by 1900. It developed substantially during and after World War II when wartime industries and the U.S. Armed Forces employed and recruited tens of thousands of African Americans from the Southeastern United States. They moved west in the second wave of the Great Migration, leaving a high influence on West Coast rock music and R&B and soul in the 1960s, including Seattle native Jimi Hendrix, a pioneer in hard rock, who was of African-American and alleged Cherokee descent.

Native Americans lived on Indian reservations or jurisdiction lands such as the Colville Indian Reservation (including several Interior Salish tribes, Makah, Muckleshoot Indian Reservation, Quinault, Spokane Indian Reservation, and Yakama Indian Reservation. The westernmost and Pacific coasts have primarily American Indian communities, such as the Chinook, Lummi, and Coast Salish. Urban Indian communities formed by the U.S. Bureau of Indian Affairs relocation programs in Seattle since the end of World War II brought a variety of Native American peoples to this diverse metropolis. The city was named for Chief Seattle in the very early 1850s when European Americans settled the sound.

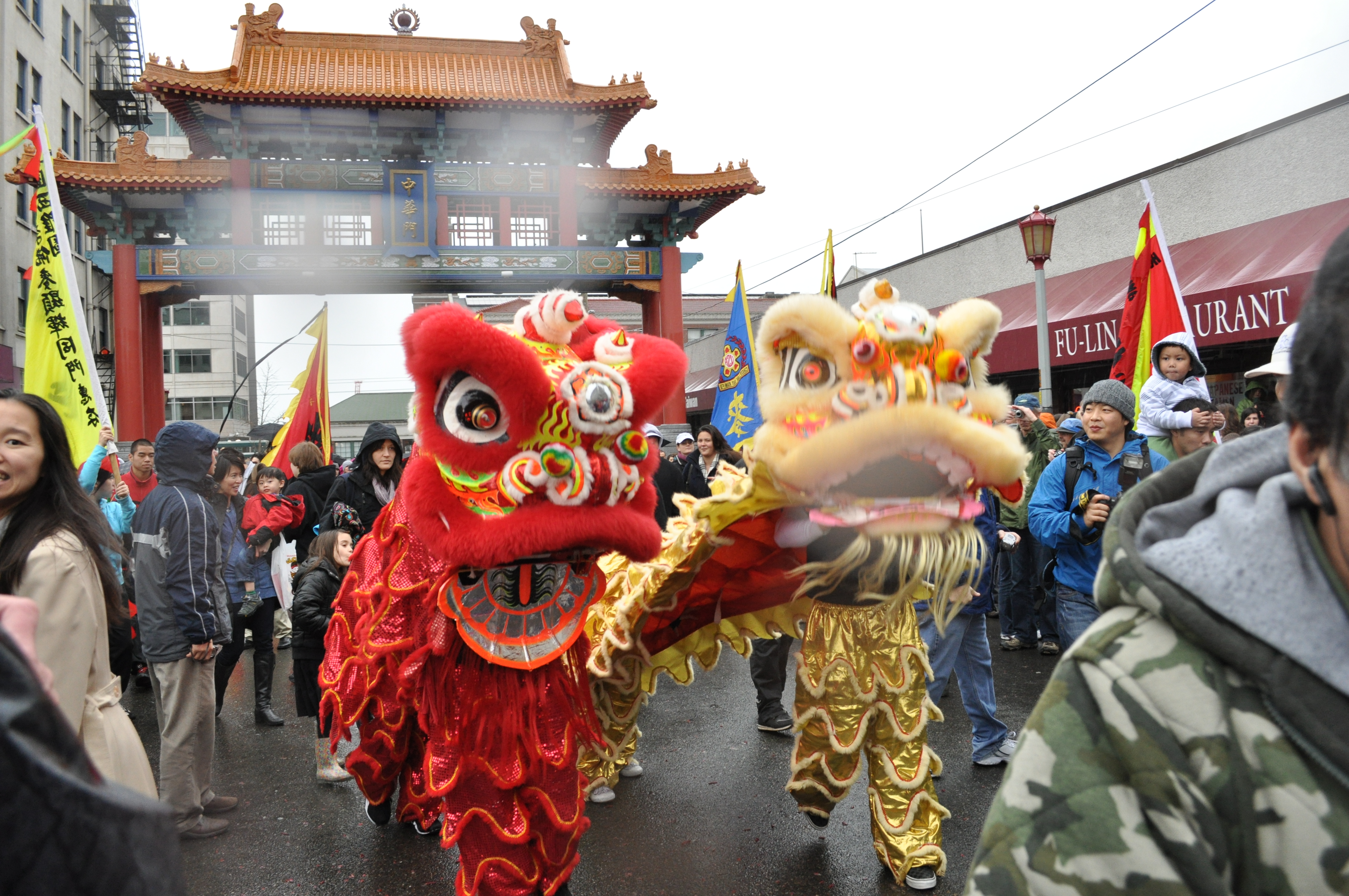
Chinese New Year, Seattle (2011)

Asian Americans are mostly concentrated in the Seattle−Tacoma metropolitan area. Seattle, Bellevue, and Redmond, which are all in King County, have sizable Chinese communities (including Taiwanese), as well as significant Indian and Japanese communities. The Chinatown–International District in Seattle has a historical Chinese population dating back to the 1860s, who mainly emigrated from Guangdong Province in southern China, and is home to a diverse East and Southeast Asian community.

Koreans are heavily concentrated in the suburban cities of Federal Way and Auburn to the south, and in Lynnwood to the north. Tacoma is home to thousands of Cambodians, and has one of the largest Cambodian-American communities in the United States, along with Long Beach, California, and Lowell, Massachusetts. The Vietnamese and Filipino populations of Washington are mostly concentrated within the Seattle metropolitan area.

Washington state has the second highest percentage of Pacific Islander people in the mainland U.S. (behind Utah). In 2009, the Seattle–Tacoma area was home to more than 15,000 people of Samoan ancestry, who mainly reside in southeast Seattle, Tacoma, Federal Way, and in SeaTac.

The most numerous ethnic (not racial) group is Latinos, who comprise 11% of Washington's population. Mexican Americans formed a large ethnic group in the Chehalis Valley, Skagit Valley, farming areas of Yakima Valley, and Eastern Washington. They were reported to at least date as far back as the 1800s. But it was in the late 20th century, that large-scale Mexican immigration and other Latinos settled in the southern suburbs of Seattle, with limited concentrations in King, Pierce, and Snohomish Counties during the region's real estate construction booms in the 1980s and 1990s.

Washington has a large Ethiopian community, with many Eritrean residents as well. Both emerged in the late 1960s, and developed since 1980. In 2010, an estimated 30,000 Somali immigrants lived in the Seattle area.

=== Languages ===
Top 10 non-English languages spoken in Washington
| Language | Percentage of population (as of 2010) |
|---|---|
| Spanish | 7.79% |
| Chinese (Note: Including Mandarin and Cantonese) | 1.19% |
| Vietnamese | 0.94% |
| Tagalog | 0.84% |
| Korean | 0.83% |
| Russian | 0.80% |
| German | 0.55% |
| Japanese | 0.39% |
| French | 0.33% |
| Ukrainian | 0.27% |

In 2010, 82.51% (5,060,313) of Washington residents age 5 and older spoke English at home as a primary language. 7.79% (477,566) spoke Spanish, 1.19% (72,552) Chinese (which includes Cantonese and Standard Chinese), 0.94% (57,895) Vietnamese, 0.84% (51,301) Tagalog, 0.83% (50,757) Korean, 0.80% (49,282) Russian, and 0.55% (33,744) German. In total, 17.49% (1,073,002) of Washington's population age 5 and older spoke a mother language other than English.

=== Religion ===
Religious self-identification in Washington, per the Public Religion Research Institute's American Values Atlas in 2022.
1. Unaffiliated (43.0%)
2. Protestantism (33.0%)
3. Catholicism (13.0%)
4. Mormonism (3.00%)
5. Jehovah's Witness (1.00%)
6. New Age (3.00%)
7. Buddhism (2.00%)
8. Hinduism (1.00%)
9. Judaism (1.00%)

In 2015, the major religious affiliations of the people of Washington were:

- Christian: 50%
  - Protestantism: 33%
  - Catholicism: 17%
  - Latter-day Saint: 3%
  - Jehovah's Witness: 1%
- Unaffiliated/Other: 42%
- New Age: 3%
- Buddhism: 2%
- Judaism: 1%
- Hinduism: 1%

In 2010, the largest denominations by number of adherents were the Roman Catholic Church, with 784,332; The Church of Jesus Christ of Latter-day Saints, with 282,356; and the Assemblies of God, with 125,005.

Aquarian Tabernacle Church is the largest Wiccan church in the country.

Like other West Coast states, the percentage of Washington's population identifying themselves as "non-religious" is higher than the national average.

== Economy ==
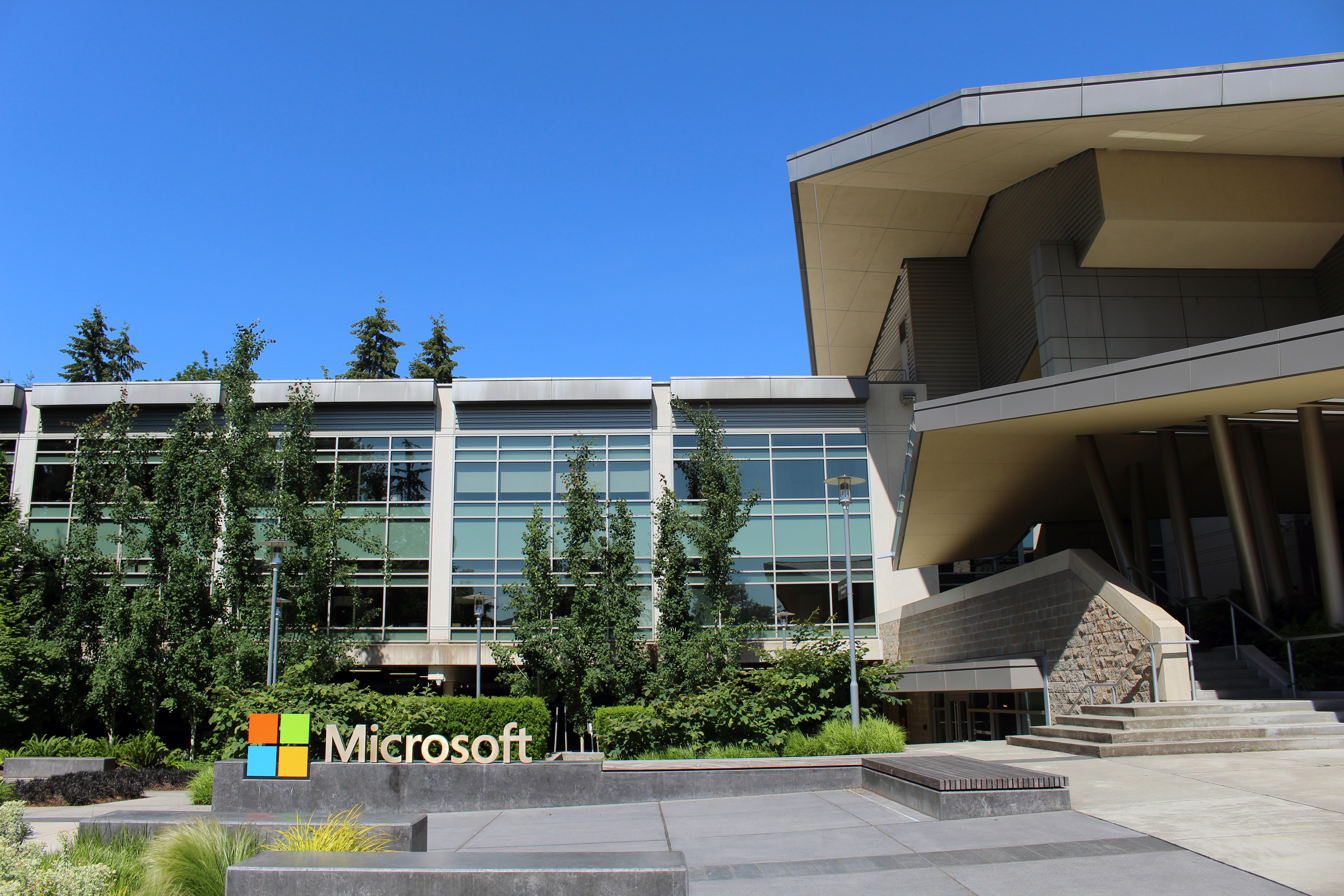
Microsoft Corporation headquarters in Redmond, an Eastside suburb of Seattle

According to the Bureau of Economic Analysis, in 2025, the State of Washington's gross state product was $894.9 billion and its per capita personal income was $89,396. As of June 2025, the state's unemployment rate was 4.5 percent, ranked 37th lowest in the United States; the rate is unchanged from June 2024.

In the late 2010s, the state had the fastest-growing economy in the United States and was tenth-largest in the nation. The minimum wage was set at $11 in 2017 and has increased annually based on a cost-of-living index; since January 1, 2024, it has been $16.28 an hour, the highest of any state. Several cities have higher minimum wages as of 2024, such as Seattle at $19.97 for large employers and Tukwila at $20.29 for large employers.

In 2025, small businesses made up 99.5% of the businesses in Washington and employed 48.7% of its work force. In 2024, based on a study by the National Partnership for Women and Families, annual wages for women in the state were $18,545 less than men, the second-largest income gap in the United States. The average gap was an increase from 2023, reported to be $17,400.

Significant business within the state include the design and manufacture of aircraft (Boeing), automotive (Paccar), computer software development (Microsoft, Bungie, Amazon, Nintendo of America, Valve, ArenaNet, Cyan Worlds), telecom (T-Mobile US), electronics, biotechnology, aluminum production, lumber and wood products (Weyerhaeuser), mining, beverages (Starbucks, Jones Soda), real estate (John L. Scott, Colliers International, Windermere Real Estate, Kidder Mathews), retail (Nordstrom, Eddie Bauer, Car Toys, Costco, R.E.I.), and tourism (Alaska Airlines, Expedia, Inc.). A Fortune magazine survey of the top 20 Most Admired Companies in the U.S. has four Washington-based companies: Amazon, Starbucks, Microsoft, and Costco. At over 80 percent the state has significant amounts of hydroelectric power generation. Significant amounts of trade with Asia pass through the ports of the Puget Sound, leading to a number six ranking of U.S. ports. Ranking combines twenty-foot equivalent units (TEUs) moved and infrastructure index.

With the passage of Initiative 1183, the Washington State Liquor Control Board (WSLCB) ended its monopoly of all-state liquor store and liquor distribution operations on June 1, 2012. The board transitioned into licensing and regulating the sale of alcohol, tobacco, and later cannabis after the passage of Initiative 502.

=== Taxes ===
The state of Washington is one of seven states that do not levy a personal income tax. However, in March 2026, Washington governor Bob Ferguson signed Senate Bill 6346 into law, establishing the state's first income tax on household income exceeding $1 million per year, effective January 1, 2028.

The state does not collect a corporate income tax or franchise tax either. Washington businesses are responsible for various other state levies, including the business and occupation tax (B & O), a gross receipts tax which charges varying rates for different types of businesses.

Washington's state base sales tax is 6.5%, which is combined with a local sales tax that varies by locality. The combined state and local retail sales tax rates increase the taxes paid by consumers, depending on the variable local sales tax rates, generally between 7.5% and 10%. As of 2024, the combined sales tax rate in Seattle was 10.25%. The Snohomish County cities of Lynnwood, Mill Creek, Mukilteo are tied for the highest sales tax rate in the state at 10.6%. These taxes apply to services as well as products, but not most foods due to a 1977 ballot measure. However, prepared foods, dietary supplements, and soft drinks remain taxable.

An excise tax applies to certain products such as gasoline, cigarettes, and alcoholic beverages. Property tax was the first tax levied in the state of Washington, and its collection accounts for about 30% of Washington's total state and local revenue. It continues to be the most important revenue source for public schools, fire protection, libraries, parks and recreation, and other special-purpose districts.

All real property and personal property are subject to tax unless specifically exempted by law. Most personal property owned by individuals is exempt from tax. Personal property tax applies to personal property used when conducting business, or to other personal property not exempt by law. All property taxes are paid to the county treasurer's office where the property is located. Neither does the state assess any tax on retirement income earned and received from another state. Washington does not collect inheritance taxes. However, the estate tax is de-coupled from the federal estate tax laws, and therefore, the state imposes its estate tax.

Washington state has the 18th highest per capita effective tax rate in the United States, as of 2017. As of June 2023, Washington has the highest gasoline prices in the United States, at an average of $4.97, in part due to the third-highest gasoline tax in the country. Their tax policy differs from neighboring Oregon's, which levies no sales tax, but does levy a personal income tax. This leads to border economic anomalies in the Portland–Vancouver metropolitan area. Additional border economies with tax disparities exist with neighboring Idaho, which has a lower sales tax rate; and British Columbia, which has higher costs for goods and has residents who commute into Washington for shopping. These include remote mailbox and courier services for American online retailers, which became ubiquitous in border communities in the 21st century.

Washington has the highest liquor tax in the United States. The spirits tax is such that it disproportionately impacts lower alcohol content cocktails containing distilled spirits as they're taxed the same based on volume and price regardless of alcohol percentage.

=== Agriculture ===
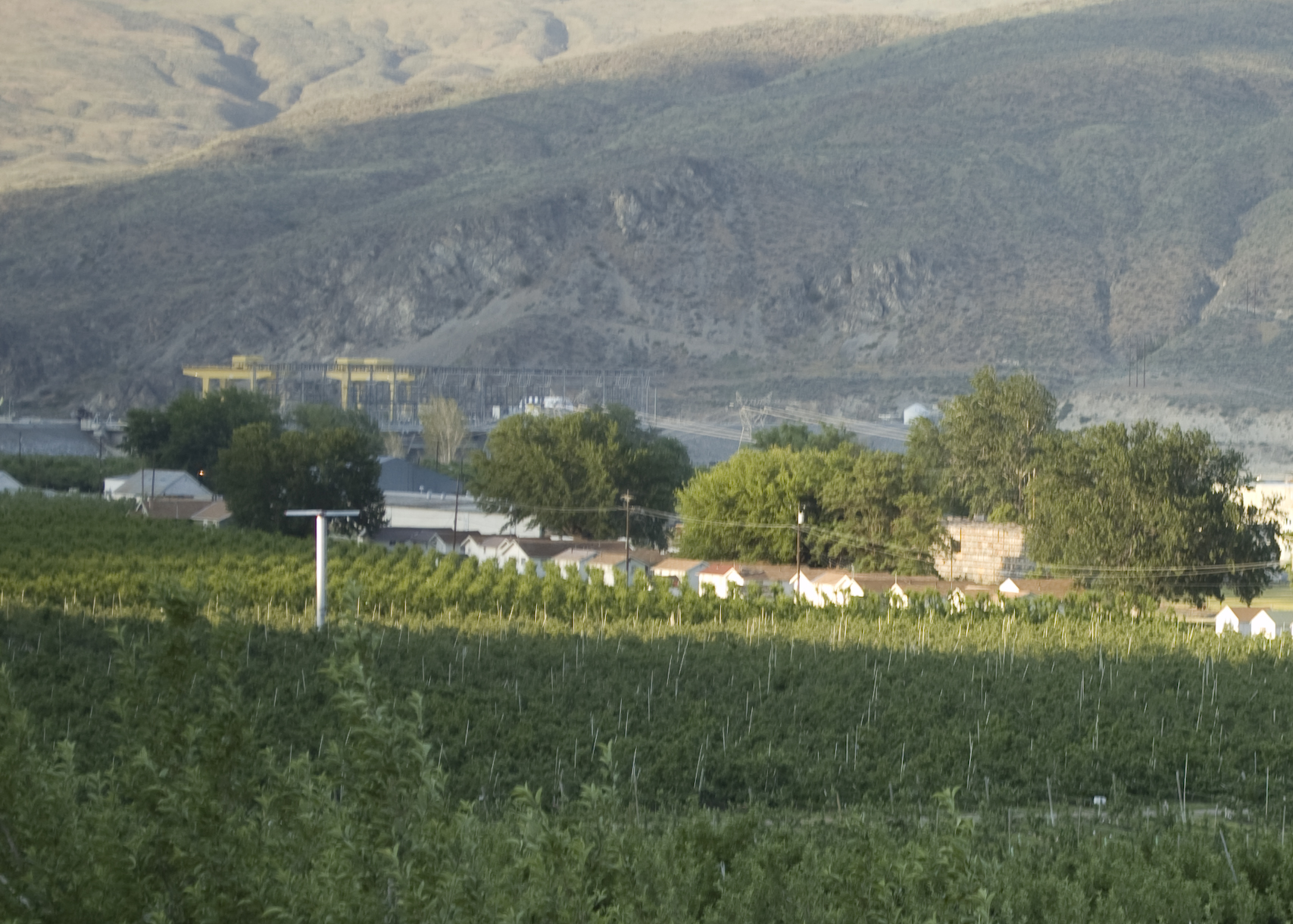
Azwell, WA, a small community of pickers' cabins and apple orchards

Washington is a leading agricultural state. In 2023, the total value of Washington's agricultural products was $14 billion. In 2014, Washington ranked first in the nation in production of red raspberries (90.5 percent of total U.S. production), hops (79.3 percent), spearmint oil (75 percent), wrinkled seed peas (70.4 percent), apples (71.1 percent), sweet cherries (62.3 percent), pears (45.6 percent), Concord grapes (55.1 percent), carrots for processing (30.6 percent), and green peas for processing (32.4 percent).

Washington also ranked second in the nation in the production of fall potatoes (a quarter of the nation's production), nectarines, apricots, asparagus, all raspberries, grapes (all varieties taken together), sweet corn for processing (a quarter of the nation's production), and summer onions (a fifth of the nation's production). Washington also ranked third in the nation in the production of dried peas, lentils, onions, and peppermint oil.

The apple industry is of particular importance to Washington. Because of the favorable climate of dry, warm summers and cold winters of central Washington, the state has led the U.S. in apple production since the 1920s. Two areas account for the vast majority of the state's apple crop: the Wenatchee–Okanogan region (comprising Chelan, Okanogan, Douglas, and Grant counties), and the Yakima region (comprising Yakima, Benton, and Kittitas counties). Washington produces seven principal varieties of apples which are exported to more than sixty countries.

=== Wine ===
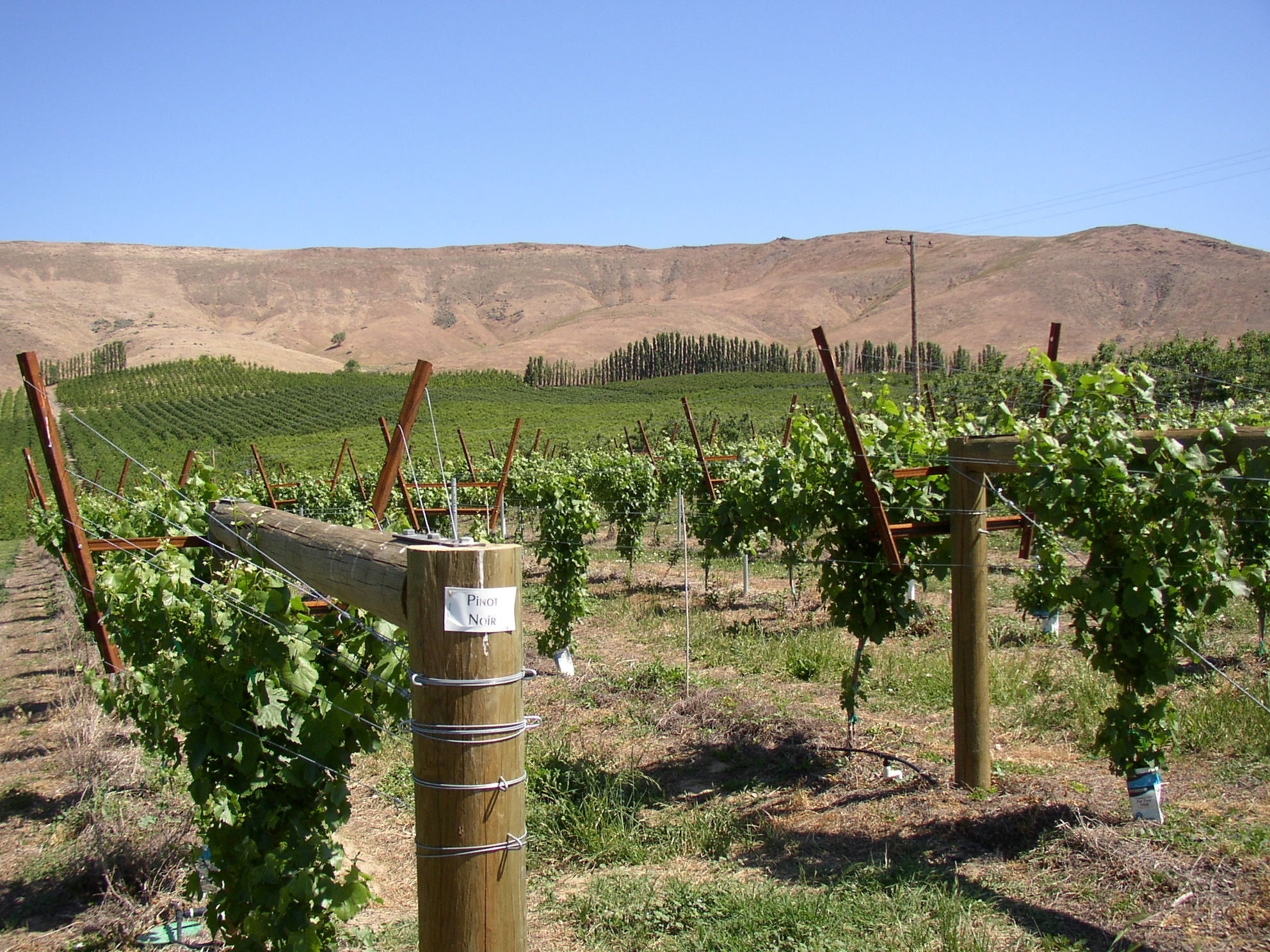
Rattlesnake Hills AVA, one of nineteen American Viticultural Areas in the state

Washington ranks third in the United States in the production of wine, behind California and New York, having produced 25.7 million U.S. gallons (97 million liters) in 2024.

In 2006, the state had over 31,000 acres (130 km^{2}) of vineyards, a harvest of 120,000 short tons (109,000 metric tons) of grapes, and exports going to more than forty countries around the world from the state's 600 wineries. By 2021, that number had grown to 1,050 wineries. While there are some viticultural activities in the cooler, wetter western half of the state, almost all (99%) of wine grape production takes place in the desert-like eastern half. The rain shadow of the Cascade Range leaves the Columbia River Basin with around 8 inches (200 mm) of annual rain fall, making irrigation and water rights of paramount interest to the Washington wine industry. Viticulture in the state is also influenced by long sunlight hours (on average, two more hours a day than in California during the growing season) and consistent temperatures.

=== Military ===
As of 2022, Washington has 108,542 total U.S. Department of Defense personnel, including active duty members of the military and civilian workers at United States Armed Forces bases. It ranks seventh among states for most active duty personnel, at over 60,000, and seventeenth for reserve members. The U.S. Navy and Marines comprise the largest branch in Washington with 45 percent of personnel, followed by the Army at 40 percent and the Air Force at 11 percent. The state is also home to the 11th-largest population of retirees and veterans at over 560,000 as of 2019.

The state's largest military installations are centered around the Puget Sound region and include Joint Base Lewis–McChord in Pierce County, the largest military base on the West Coast with over 25,000 active duty soldiers; Naval Station Everett in Snohomish County; and Naval Air Station Whidbey Island in Island County. The Kitsap Peninsula is home to Naval Base Kitsap, which includes the Puget Sound Naval Shipyard in Bremerton and Naval Submarine Base Bangor, site of the third-largest arsenal of nuclear weapons in the world with more than 1,100 warheads for submarines. Fairchild Air Force Base is a major air force installation near Spokane that has the largest aerial refueling fleet in the world. Washington also has several major companies that serve as defense contractors for the U.S. military who were awarded $6.9 billion in fiscal year 2022. The largest contractors in the state include Boeing, PacMed, and Microsoft.

=== Internet access ===
From 2009 to 2014, the Washington State Broadband Project was awarded $7.3 million in federal grants, but the program was discontinued in 2014. For infrastructure, another $166 million has been awarded since 2011 for broadband infrastructure projects in Washington state.

U.S. News & World Report ranked Washington second nationally for household internet access, and sixth for online download speed, based on data from 2014 and 2015.

In 2019, Washington State Legislature established the Washington State Broadband Office with two key mandates: high-speed internet access for 100% of WA residents by 2024 and an increase to 150/150 Mbit/s by 2028.

In March 2021, the Washington State Department of Commerce issued their first biennial report on the progress of these key mandates throughout 2020.

The report includes five sections: public survey results, digital adoption disparities as they relate to federal census data, a Partner-Plan-Fund-Build-Adopt model for continued progress, success stories, and a policy discussion conclusion.

According to the report, "...over 42,000 survey responses from nearly 32,000 unique locations, showing that 6.4 percent of respondents reported having no broadband service, and 57 percent reported service at download speeds under 25 Mbps..."

== Transportation ==
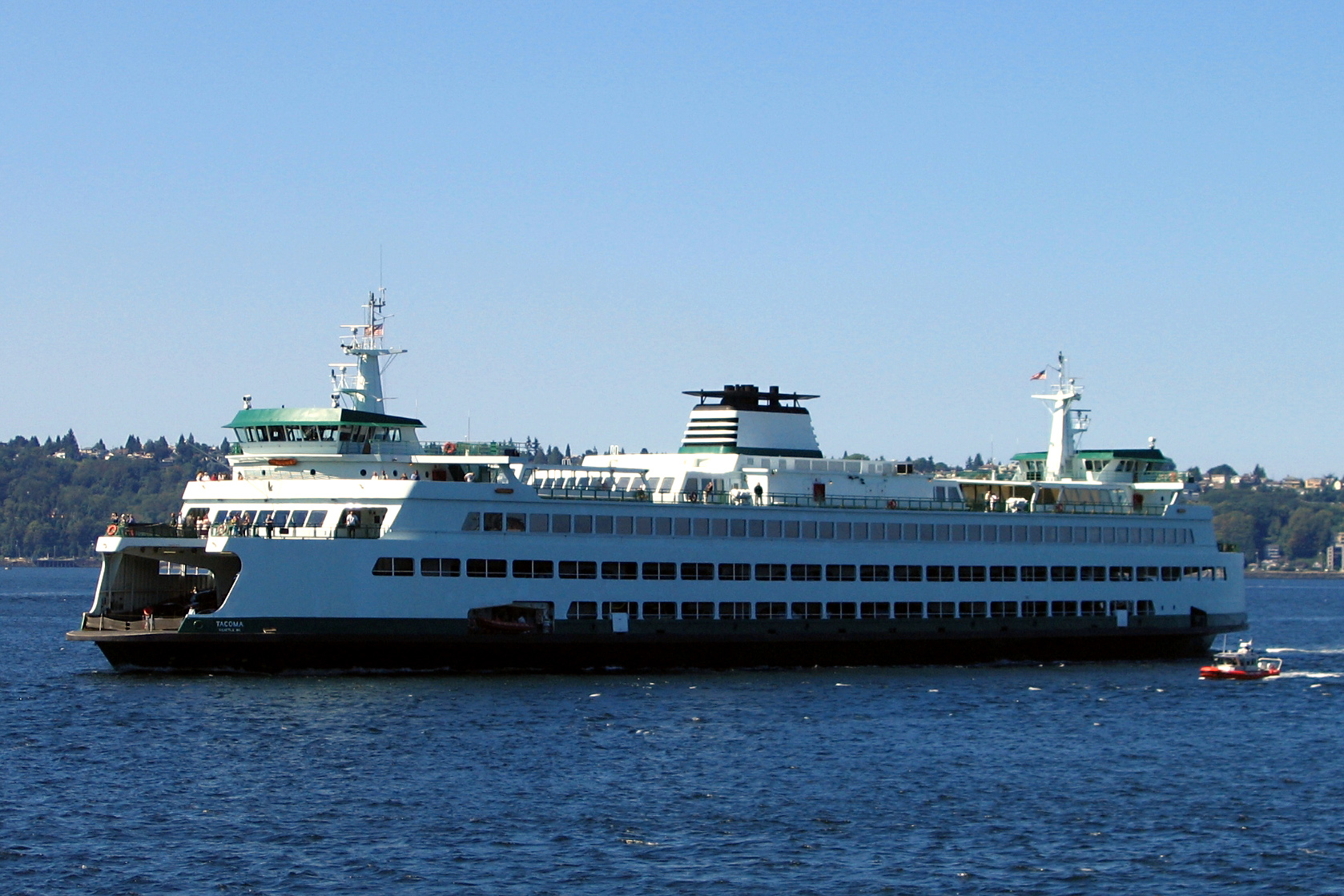
The Washington State Ferries owns the largest ferry system in the United States.

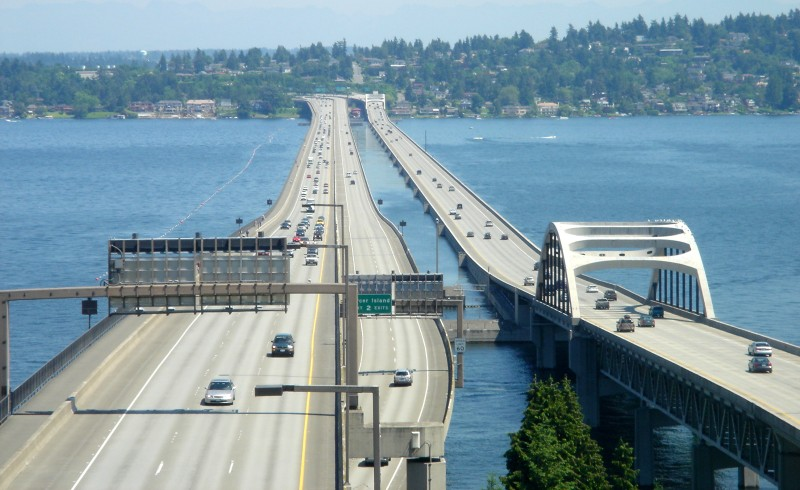
Floating bridges on Lake Washington. These are among the largest of their kind in the world.

Washington's state transportation system comprises several modes that are maintained by various government entities. The state highway system, called State Routes, includes over 7,000 miles (11,000 km) of roads and the Washington State Ferries system, the largest of its kind in the nation and the third largest in the world. There are also 57,200 miles (92,100 km) of local roads maintained by cities and counties, as well as several ferries operated by local governments. There are 140 public airfields in Washington, including 16 state airports owned by the Washington State Department of Transportation. Seattle–Tacoma International Airport (Sea–Tac) is the major commercial airport of greater Seattle. Boeing Field in Seattle is one of the busiest primary non-hub airports in the U.S.

There are extensive waterways around Washington's largest cities, including Seattle, Bellevue, Tacoma, and Olympia. The state highways incorporate an extensive network of bridges and the largest ferry system in the United States to serve transportation needs in the Puget Sound area. Washington's marine highway constitutes a fleet of twenty-eight ferries that navigate Puget Sound and its inland waterways to 20 different ports of call, completing close to 147,000 sailings each year.

Washington is home to four of the five longest floating bridges in the world: the Evergreen Point Floating Bridge, Lacey V. Murrow Memorial Bridge and Homer M. Hadley Memorial Bridge over Lake Washington, and the Hood Canal Bridge which connects the Olympic Peninsula and Kitsap Peninsula. Among its most famous bridges is the Tacoma Narrows Bridge, which collapsed in 1940 and was rebuilt.

Washington has 75 port districts, including several major seaports on the Pacific Ocean. Among these are ports in Seattle, Tacoma, Kalama, Anacortes, Vancouver, Everett, Longview, Grays Harbor, Olympia, and Port Angeles. The Columbia and Snake rivers also provide 465 miles (748 km) of inland waterways that are navigable by barges as far east as Lewiston, Idaho.

The Cascade Mountain Range also impedes transportation. Washington operates and maintains roads over seven major mountain passes and eight minor passes. During the winter months, some of these passes are plowed, sanded, and kept safe with avalanche control. Not all stay open through the winter. The North Cascades Highway, State Route 20, closes every year due to snowfall and avalanches in the area of Washington Pass. The Cayuse and Chinook passes east of Mount Rainier also close in winter.

Washington is crossed by several freight railroads, and Amtrak's passenger Cascade route between Eugene, Oregon, and Vancouver, BC is the eighth busiest Amtrak service in the U.S. Seattle's King Street Station, the busiest station in Washington, and the 15th busiest in the U.S., serves as the terminus for the two long-distance Amtrak routes in Washington, the Empire Builder to Chicago and the Coast Starlight to Los Angeles. The Sounder commuter rail service operates in Seattle and its surrounding cities, between Everett and Lakewood. The intercity network includes the Cascade Tunnel, the longest railroad tunnel in the United States, which is part of the Stevens Pass route on the BNSF Northern Transcom.

The Seattle area is home to Link light rail, a regional rail system managed by Sound Transit that spans 63 miles (101 km). It comprises three lines that serve Seattle, southern Snohomish County, the Eastside, southern King County, and Tacoma. The system is planned to expand to 116 miles (187 km) by the 2050s through a ballot measure that was approved in 2016. Seattle also has a 3.8-mile (6.1 km) streetcar network with two lines and plans to expand further. 32 local bus transit systems exist across the state, the busiest being King County Metro, located in Seattle and King County, with just above 122 million riders in 2017. Clark County has historically resisted proposals to extend Portland's MAX Light Rail into Vancouver, including the rejection of two ballot measures, but light rail is slated to be included in a future replacement of the Interstate Bridge.

Some tribal governments offer free bus service on their respective reservations, including on the Muckleshoot, Spokane, and Yakama Indian Reservations.

== Environment ==
Hanford Nuclear Reservation is considered one of the most contaminated nuclear sites in the United States and is the focus of the nation's largest environmental cleanup. The radioactive materials are known to be leaking from Hanford into the environment. Another major cleanup site is the Duwamish River basin in Seattle, among the most contaminated bodies of water in the United States due to industrial runoff.

In 2007, Washington became the first state in the nation to target all forms of highly toxic brominated flame retardants known as PBDEs for elimination from the many common household products in which they are being used. A 2004 study of 40 mothers from Oregon, Washington, British Columbia, and Montana found PBDEs in the breast milk of every woman tested.

Three recent studies by the Washington State Department of Ecology showed toxic chemicals banned decades ago linger in the environment and concentrate in the food chain. In one of the studies, state government scientists found unacceptable levels of toxic substances in 93 samples of freshwater fish from 45 sites. The toxic substances included PCBs, dioxins, two chlorinated pesticides, DDE, dieldrin and PBDEs. As a result of the study, the department will investigate the sources of PCBs in the Wenatchee River, where unhealthy levels of PCBs were found in mountain whitefish. Based on the 2007 information and a previous 2004 Ecology study, the Washington State Department of Health advises the public not to eat mountain whitefish from the Wenatchee River from Leavenworth downstream to where the river joins the Columbia, due to unhealthy levels of PCBs. Study results also showed high levels of contaminants in fish tissue that scientists collected from Lake Washington and the Spokane River, where fish consumption advisories are already in effect.

In March 2006, Governor Christine Gregoire signed into law the recently approved House Bill 2322. This bill would limit phosphorus content in dishwashing detergents statewide to 0.5 percent over the next six years. Although the ban took effect statewide in 2010, it was implemented earlier in Whatcom, Spokane, and Clark counties in 2008. A recent discovery had linked high contents of phosphorus in water to a boom in algae population. An invasive amount of algae in bodies of water would lead to a variety of excess ecological and technological issues.

== Utilities ==
In 2023, the electricity sold by public and private suppliers for use in Washington was primarily sourced from hydroelectric dams (49%), followed by natural gas (12%), wind (10%), coal (6.5%), and nuclear (4%). A total of 89.3 million Megawatt-hours of electricity was generated statewide in 2023. As of 2025, Washington generates the most hydroelectric power of all U.S. states and accounts for approximately 25% of the nation's total hydroelectric generation capability. Its percentage of energy from all renewable sources is third among U.S. states, behind Vermont and South Dakota. Residential dwellings in the state are primarily heated with electricity and natural gas.

== Government and politics ==
=== State government ===
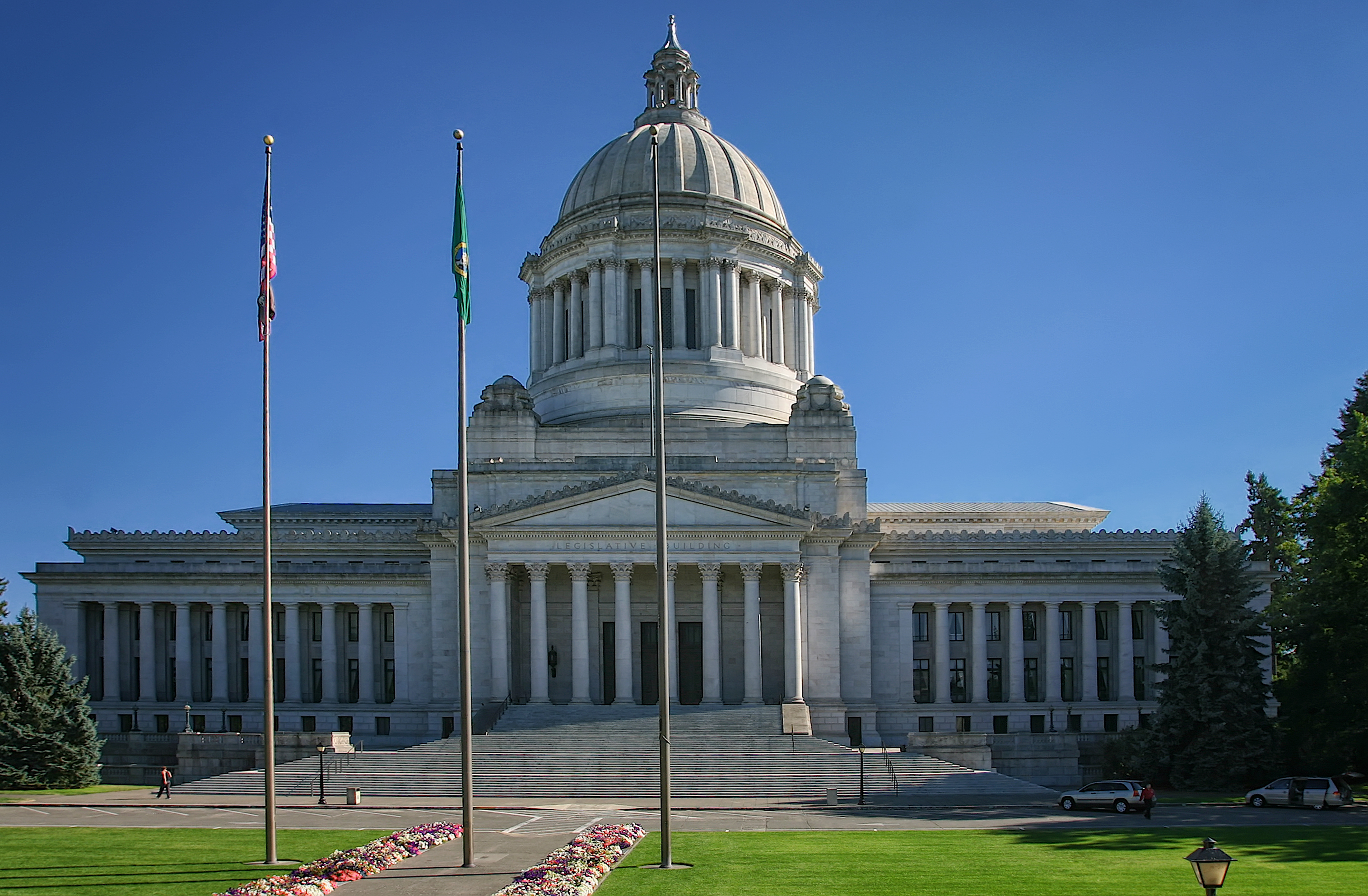
The Washington State Capitol building in Olympia

Washington's executive branch is headed by a governor elected for a four-year term. The current statewide elected officials are:

- Bob Ferguson, Governor (D)
- Denny Heck, Lieutenant Governor (D)
- Steve Hobbs, Secretary of State (D)
- Mike Pellicciotti, State Treasurer (D)
- Patrice McCarthy, State Auditor (D)
- Nick Brown, Attorney General (D)
- Chris Reykdal, Superintendent of Public Instruction (NP/D) (Note: The Washington State Office of Superintendent of Public Instruction is officially nonpartisan, but Superintendent Reykdal identifies with the Democratic Party.)
- Dave Upthegrove, Commissioner of Public Lands (D)
- Patty Kuderer, Insurance Commissioner (D)

The bicameral Washington State Legislature is the state's legislative branch. The state legislature is composed of a lower House of Representatives and an upper State Senate. The state is divided into 49 legislative districts of equal population, each of which elects two representatives and one senator. Representatives serve two-year terms, while senators serve for four years. There are no term limits. The Democratic Party has a majority in the House and Senate.

The Washington Supreme Court is the highest court in the state and meets in Olympia. Nine justices serve on the bench and are elected statewide or appointed by the governor to fill vacancies. There are 30 judicial districts, each with a superior court; these districts roughly correspond to counties, with some districts that combine rural or closely related counties.

=== Federal representation ===
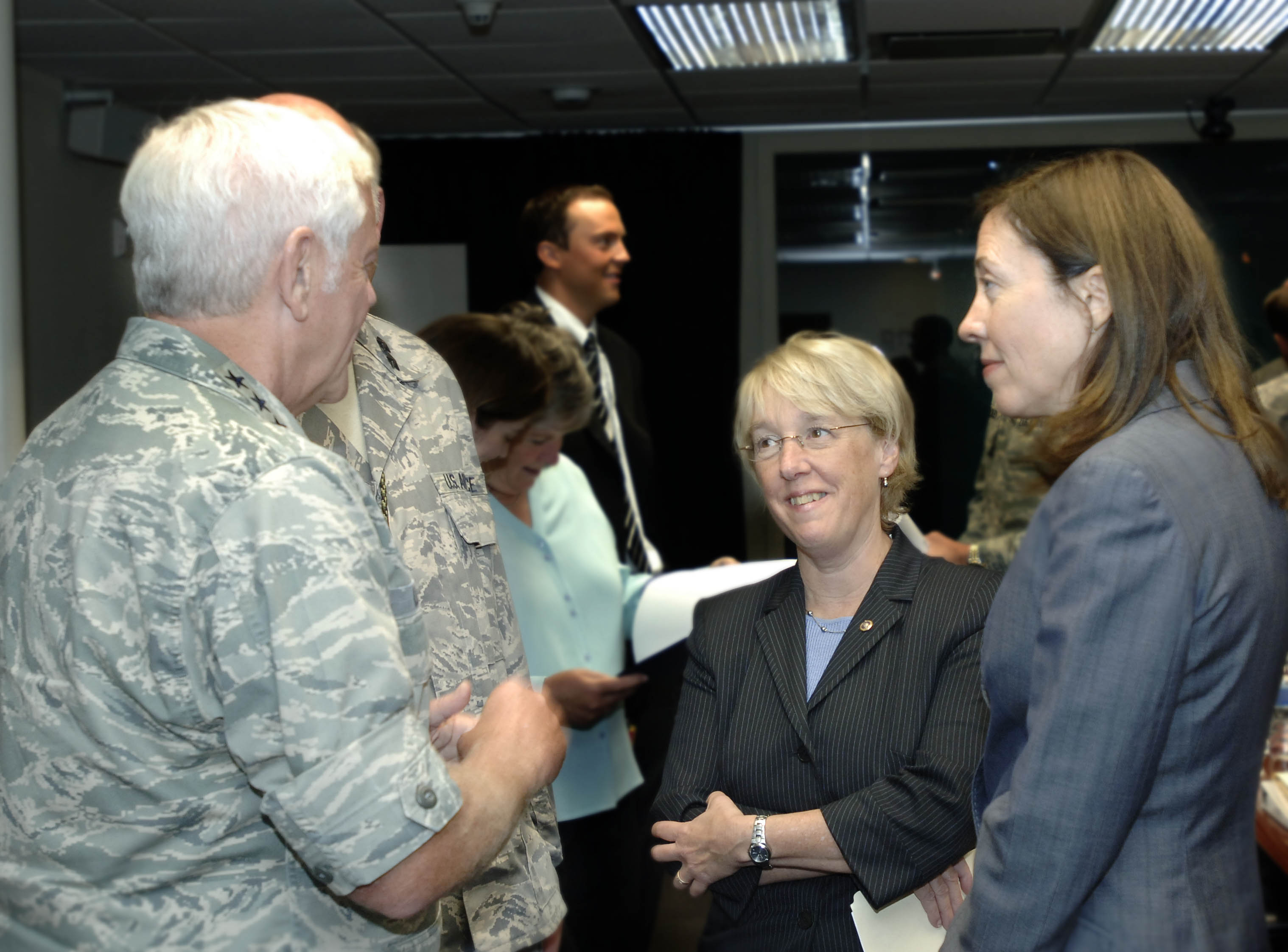
U.S. Senators Patty Murray and Maria Cantwell visit Fairchild Air Force Base.

The two current United States senators from Washington are Patty Murray and Maria Cantwell, both Democrats. Murray has represented the state since 1993, while Cantwell assumed office in 2001. The state is one of four with two female senators.

Washington's ten representatives in the United States House of Representatives (see map of districts) as of the 2022 election are Suzan DelBene (D-1), Rick Larsen (D-2), Marie Gluesenkamp Perez (D-3), Dan Newhouse (R-4), Michael Baumgartner (R-5), Emily Randall (D-6), Pramila Jayapal (D-7), Kim Schrier (D-8), Adam Smith (D-9), and Marilyn Strickland (D-10).

Due to Congressional redistricting as a result of the 2010 census, Washington gained one seat in the United States House of Representatives. With the extra seat, Washington also gained one electoral vote, raising its total to 12.

=== Politics ===
United States presidential election results for Washington
| Year | Republican | | Democratic | | Third party(ies) | |
| Year | No. | % | No. | % | No. | % |
|---|---|---|---|---|---|---|
| 1892 | 36,460 | 41.45% | 29,802 | 33.88% | 21,707 | 24.68% |
| 1896 | 39,153 | 41.84% | 53,314 | 56.97% | 1,116 | 1.19% |
| 1900 | 57,456 | 53.44% | 44,833 | 41.70% | 5,235 | 4.87% |
| 1904 | 101,540 | 69.95% | 28,098 | 19.36% | 15,513 | 10.69% |
| 1908 | 106,062 | 57.68% | 58,691 | 31.92% | 19,126 | 10.40% |
| 1912 | 70,445 | 21.82% | 86,840 | 26.90% | 165,514 | 51.27% |
| 1916 | 167,208 | 43.89% | 183,388 | 48.13% | 30,398 | 7.98% |
| 1920 | 223,137 | 55.96% | 84,298 | 21.14% | 91,280 | 22.89% |
| 1924 | 220,224 | 52.24% | 42,842 | 10.16% | 158,483 | 37.60% |
| 1928 | 335,844 | 67.06% | 156,772 | 31.30% | 8,224 | 1.64% |
| 1932 | 208,645 | 33.94% | 353,260 | 57.46% | 52,909 | 8.61% |
| 1936 | 206,892 | 29.88% | 459,579 | 66.38% | 25,867 | 3.74% |
| 1940 | 322,123 | 40.58% | 462,145 | 58.22% | 9,565 | 1.20% |
| 1944 | 361,689 | 42.24% | 486,774 | 56.84% | 7,865 | 0.92% |
| 1948 | 386,315 | 42.68% | 476,165 | 52.61% | 42,579 | 4.70% |
| 1952 | 599,107 | 54.33% | 492,845 | 44.69% | 10,756 | 0.98% |
| 1956 | 620,430 | 53.91% | 523,002 | 45.44% | 7,457 | 0.65% |
| 1960 | 629,273 | 50.68% | 599,298 | 48.27% | 13,001 | 1.05% |
| 1964 | 470,366 | 37.37% | 779,881 | 61.97% | 8,309 | 0.66% |
| 1968 | 588,510 | 45.12% | 616,037 | 47.23% | 99,734 | 7.65% |
| 1972 | 837,135 | 56.92% | 568,334 | 38.64% | 65,378 | 4.44% |
| 1976 | 777,732 | 50.00% | 717,323 | 46.11% | 60,479 | 3.89% |
| 1980 | 865,244 | 49.66% | 650,193 | 37.32% | 226,957 | 13.03% |
| 1984 | 1,051,670 | 55.82% | 807,352 | 42.86% | 24,888 | 1.32% |
| 1988 | 903,835 | 48.46% | 933,516 | 50.05% | 27,902 | 1.50% |
| 1992 | 731,234 | 31.97% | 993,037 | 43.41% | 563,294 | 24.62% |
| 1996 | 840,712 | 37.30% | 1,123,323 | 49.84% | 289,802 | 12.86% |
| 2000 | 1,108,864 | 44.58% | 1,247,652 | 50.16% | 130,917 | 5.26% |
| 2004 | 1,304,894 | 45.64% | 1,510,201 | 52.82% | 43,989 | 1.54% |
| 2008 | 1,229,216 | 40.48% | 1,750,848 | 57.65% | 56,814 | 1.87% |
| 2012 | 1,290,670 | 41.29% | 1,755,396 | 56.16% | 79,450 | 2.54% |
| 2016 | 1,221,747 | 36.83% | 1,742,718 | 52.54% | 352,554 | 10.63% |
| 2020 | 1,584,651 | 38.77% | 2,369,612 | 57.97% | 133,368 | 3.26% |
| 2024 | 1,530,923 | 39.01% | 2,245,849 | 57.23% | 147,471 | 3.76% |

A treemap of the popular vote by county, 2016 presidential election

The state is typically thought of as politically divided by the Cascade Mountains, with Western Washington being liberal (particularly the I-5 Corridor) and Eastern Washington being conservative.

Although the eastern half of the state votes heavily Republican, the overwhelming Democratic dominance in the Seattle metropolitan area has turned Washington into a reliably blue state. It is considered part of the Blue wall of states that have voted Democratic in every presidential election since 1992. This voting streak began with Democrat Michael Dukakis narrowly capturing Washington in 1988. The state has since turned much more solidly blue, beginning with Obama's landslide victory in 2008, and Democrats winning the state by double digits in every subsequent presidential election. In 2024, Washington had the smallest swing to the right of any state, swinging by just 1%, compared to the national swing of about 6%.

Washington was considered a key swing state in 1968, and it was the only western state to give its electoral votes to Democratic nominee Hubert Humphrey over his Republican opponent Richard Nixon. Washington was considered a part of the 1994 Republican Revolution, and had the biggest pick-up in the house for Republicans, who picked up seven of Washington's nine House seats. However, this dominance did not last for long, as Democrats picked up one seat in the 1996 election, and two more in 1998, giving the Democrats a 5–4 majority.

In 2013 and 2014, both houses of the Washington State Legislature (the Washington Senate and the Washington House of Representatives) were controlled by Democrats. The state senate was under Republican control, due to two Democrats' joining Republicans to form the Majority Coalition Caucus. After the 2014 elections, the Democrats retained control of the House, while Republicans took a majority in the Senate without the need for a coalition. In November 2017, a special election gave Democrats a one-seat majority in the Senate and complete control over state government. Since then, in the 2018 election, the Democrats have only expanded their majorities.

The governorship is currently held by Democrat Bob Ferguson. No state has gone longer without a Republican governor than Washington. Democrats have controlled the Washington Governor's Mansion for 41 years; the last Republican governor was John Spellman, who left office in 1985. Washington has not voted for a Republican senator, governor, or presidential candidate since 1994, tying with Delaware for the longest streak in the country.

Washington uses the non-partisan blanket primary system after the approval of Initiative 872 in 2004. All candidates run on the same ballot during primary elections and the top two candidates advance to the general election in November, regardless of party affiliation. This has resulted in several same-party general election match-ups. In a 2020 study, Washington was ranked as the second easiest state for citizens to vote in.

The 2023 American Values Atlas by the Public Religion Research Institute found that same-sex marriage is supported near-universally in Washington.

=== Notable legislation ===
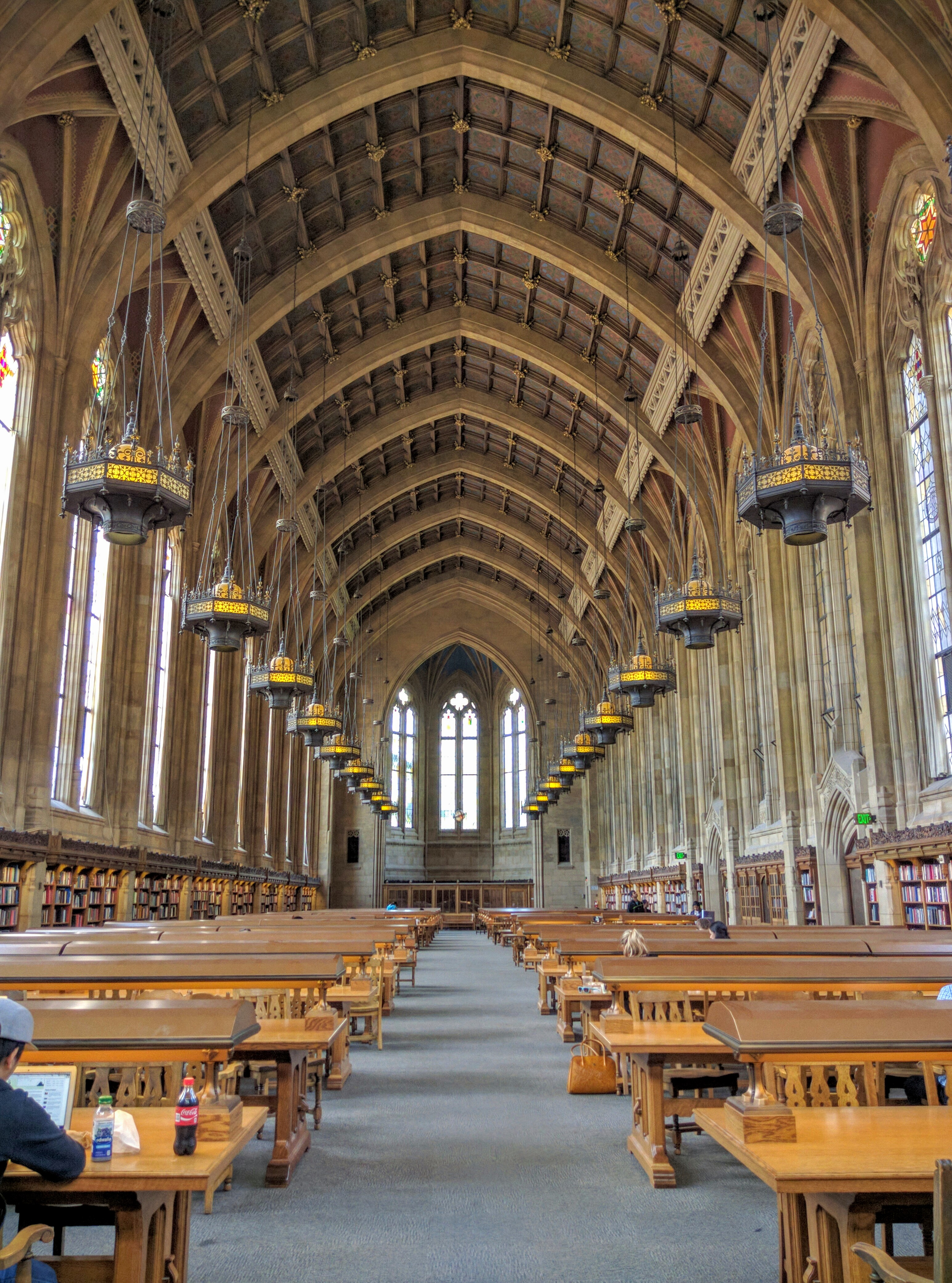
The Suzzallo Library reading room at the state's flagship University of Washington

Washington is one of the ten states to have legalized assisted suicide. In 2008, the Washington Death with Dignity Act ballot initiative passed and became law.

In November 2009, Washington voters approved full domestic partnerships via Referendum 71, marking the first time voters in any state expanded recognition of same-sex relationships at the ballot box. Three years later, in November 2012, same-sex marriage was affirmed via Referendum 74, making Washington one of only three states to have approved same-sex marriage by popular vote.

In November 2012, Washington was one of the first two states to approve the legal sale and possession of cannabis for both recreational and medical use with Initiative 502. Although marijuana is still illegal under U.S. federal law, persons 21 and older in Washington state can possess up to one ounce of marijuana, 16 ounces of marijuana-infused product in solid form, 72 ounces of marijuana-infused product in liquid form, or any combination of all three, and can legally consume marijuana and marijuana-infused products.

In November 2016, voters approved Initiative 1433, which among other things requires employers to guarantee paid sick leave to most workers. On January 1, 2018, the law went into effect, with Washington becoming the seventh state with paid sick leave requirements.

With the passage of Initiative 1639 in the 2018 elections, Washington adopted stricter gun laws.

Washington enacted a measure in May 2019 in favor of sanctuary cities, similar to California and Oregon laws which are among the strongest statewide mandates in the nation.

In 2019, the legislature passed the Clean Energy Transformation Act, which requires all electricity sales to be from zero-carbon sources by 2045 and net-zero by 2030.

== Education ==
=== Elementary and secondary education ===
As of the 2024–2025 school year, 1.1 million students were enrolled in elementary and secondary schools in Washington. 68 thousand teachers were employed in 2023–2024 and the cost to educate each pupil was $18,649.

As of August 2009, there were 295 school districts in the state, serviced by nine Educational Service Districts. Washington School Information Processing Cooperative (a non-profit opt-in state agency) provides information management systems for fiscal and human resources and student data. Elementary and secondary schools are under the jurisdiction of the Washington State Office of Superintendent of Public Instruction (OSPI).

High school juniors and seniors in Washington have the option of using the state's Running Start program. Begun by the state legislature in 1990, it allows students to attend institutions of higher education at public expense, simultaneously earning high school and college credit. The state has 141 schools that offer dual language programs in 14 languages, primarily Spanish, beginning in kindergarten.

Washington has several public arts-focused high schools including Tacoma School of the Arts, the Vancouver School of Arts and Academics, and The Center School. There are five science- and math-based high schools: one in the Tri-Cities known as Delta, one in Tacoma known as SAMI, another in Seattle known as Raisbeck Aviation High School, one in Redmond known as Tesla STEM High School, and one in Vancouver known as Vancouver iTech Preparatory.

=== Higher education ===
In 2023, U.S. News & World Report ranked Washington state at No. 2 in its ranking of "Best States for Higher Education," taking into consideration the share of the population with undergraduate degrees, graduation rates across colleges and universities, as well as the costs associated with studying in each state. There are more than 40 institutions of higher education in Washington. The state has major research universities, technical schools, religious schools, and private career colleges.

Washington has six public four-year universities. The flagship school of Washington's university system is the University of Washington and its land-grant institution is Washington State University, each of which have been designated as "R1: Doctoral Universities – Very high research activity" schools by the Carnegie Classification of Institutions of Higher Education. The other four public universities are Western Washington University, Eastern Washington University, Central Washington University, and the Evergreen State College, a public liberal arts college.

Major private four-year colleges and universities include the Jesuit colleges Seattle University and Gonzaga University, Christian schools Seattle Pacific University and Pacific Lutheran University, as well as smaller liberal arts colleges like Annapolis Group members Whitman College and the University of Puget Sound.

The largest two-year college system in Washington is that of the Seattle Colleges District, which is the state's second-largest institution of higher education by total enrollment after the University of Washington.

== Media ==
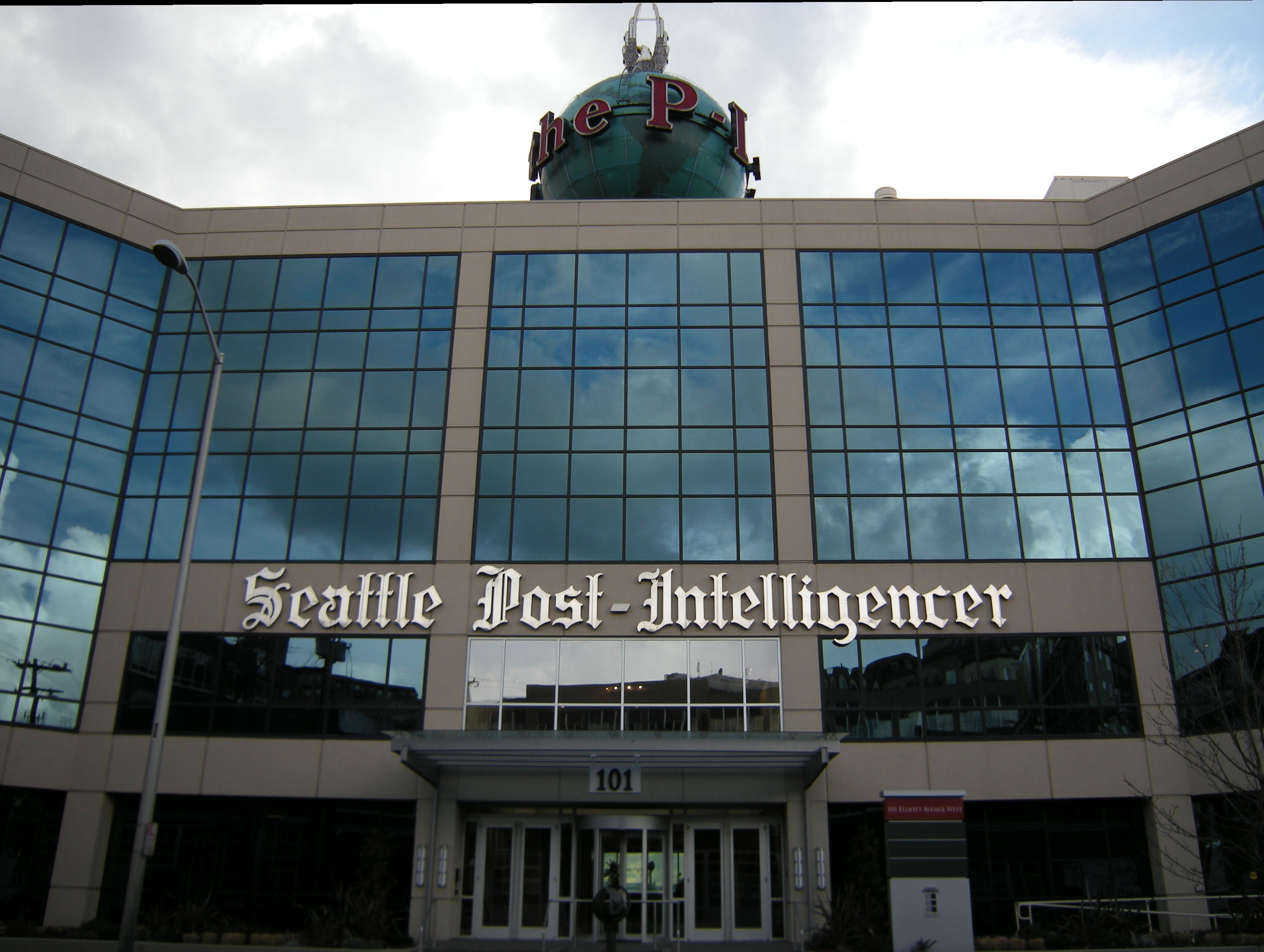
The former offices of the Seattle Post-Intelligencer, a major daily newspaper

As of 2022, Washington has 20 daily newspapers and 96 weekly newspapers that serve local and hyperlocal markets. The most-circulated newspaper in the state is The Seattle Times, which is also among the most-circulated newspapers in the United States. Other major daily newspapers include The Spokesman-Review in Spokane, The News Tribune in Tacoma, The Columbian in Vancouver, The Daily Herald in Everett, the Tri-City Herald in Kennewick, and the Kitsap Sun in Bremerton.

Several national and regional chains own and operate a number of local weekly newspapers, including the Adams Publishing Group, Sound Publishing, The Seattle Times Company, and the McClatchy Company. Free weekly newspapers include The Stranger, Seattle Weekly, and the Inlander. The Seattle area also has a number of publications in English and other languages for ethnic communities, including the Seattle Chinese Post, International Examiner, and Northwest Asian Weekly. Since 2004, Washington has lost 37 local newspapers and seen the consolidation of smaller papers, including neighborhood and suburban papers in the Seattle metropolitan area. Several newspapers have also switched to online-only publication, including Seattle's morning daily Post-Intelligencer in 2009.

The state is divided into four Designated Market Areas by Nielsen Media Research: Seattle–Tacoma, which also extends east to Wenatchee; Portland, which includes most of Southwestern Washington; Spokane, which also includes northern Idaho; and Yakima–Pasco–Richland–Kennewick. The Seattle–Tacoma market is the largest in the Pacific Northwest and has been the 13th largest in the United States since 2009.

In 2009, Washington had 39 full-power television stations and an additional 11 from Portland, Oregon. Most are affiliated with a national or regional broadcasting network. The state is home to 383 stations licensed with the Federal Communications Commission (FCC). These radio stations broadcast to local markets and online, where Seattle-based music station KEXP-FM has found a worldwide following.

== Health care ==
=== Insurance ===
The top two health insurers as of 2017 were Premera Blue Cross, with 24 percent market share, followed by Kaiser Permanente at 21 percent. For the individual market, Molina Healthcare had the top share at 23%.

The state adopted the Washington Healthplanfinder system in 2014 after the passage of the federal Patient Protection and Affordable Care Act (also known as "ObamaCare"). The system is used by approximately 90 percent of Washington residents who purchase or acquire their health insurance directly rather than through an employer. The state's Medicaid program, named Washington Apple Health, provides healthcare coverage to people with disabilities or low incomes.

The state of Washington reformed its health care system in 1993 through the Washington Health Services Act. The legislation required individuals to obtain health insurance or face penalties, and required employers to provide insurance to employees. Health insurance companies were required to sell policies to all individuals, regardless of pre-existing conditions, and cover basic benefits. The act was mostly repealed in 1995 before it could go into full effect.

=== Facilities ===
Hospitals exist across the state, but many of Washington's best-known medical facilities are located in and around Seattle. The Seattle–Tacoma area has six major hospitals: Harborview Medical Center, University of Washington Medical Center, Seattle Children's, Swedish Medical Center, MultiCare Tacoma General Hospital, and St. Joseph Medical Center. The Seattle-area hospitals are concentrated on First Hill, which is home to Virginia Mason Medical Center. The neighborhood has received the nickname "Pill Hill" owing to the high concentration of healthcare facilities.

As of 2023, the state has over 14,000 total hospital beds that are licensed for acute care in 93 facilities. Several religious healthcare providers, primarily Catholic organizations, control 49 percent of the state's hospital beds and have acquired and consolidated major systems in Washington.

== Culture ==
=== Sports ===
Pickleball, a racquet sport invented on Bainbridge Island in 1965, was designated as Washington's official state sport in 2022. For three years in a row, 2021, 2022 and 2023, the sport was named the fastest growing sport in the United States by the Sports and Fitness Industry Association (SFIA).

==== Major professional teams ====
| Club | Sport | League | Stadium and city |
|---|---|---|---|
| Seattle Kraken | Ice hockey | National Hockey League (West) | Climate Pledge Arena, Seattle |
| Seattle Mariners | Baseball | Major League Baseball (AL) | T-Mobile Park, Seattle |
| Seattle Reign FC | Soccer | National Women's Soccer League | Lumen Field, Seattle |
| Seattle Seahawks | Football | National Football League (NFC) | Lumen Field, Seattle |
| Seattle Sounders FC | Soccer | Major League Soccer (West) | Lumen Field, Seattle |
| Seattle Storm | Basketball | Women's National Basketball Association | Climate Pledge Arena, Seattle |
| Seattle Torrent | Ice hockey | Professional Women's Hockey League | Climate Pledge Arena, Seattle |

==== Minor professional and amateur teams ====
| Club | Sport | League | Stadium and city |
|---|---|---|---|
| Ballard FC | Soccer | USL League Two | Interbay Stadium, Seattle |
| Everett AquaSox | Baseball | Pacific Coast League (High-A) | Everett Memorial Stadium, Everett |
| Everett Silvertips | Ice hockey | Western Hockey League | Angel of the Winds Arena, Everett |
| Midlakes United | Soccer | USL League Two | Bellevue College Soccer Field, Bellevue |
| FC Olympia | Soccer | USL League Two | Well 80 Pitch, Olympia |
| Seattle Sea Dragons | American football | XFL | Lumen Field, Seattle |
| Seattle Majestics | American football | Women's Football Alliance | French Field, Kent |
| Seattle Mist | Indoor football | Legends Football League | ShoWare Center, Kent |
| Seattle Saracens | Rugby union | Canadian Direct Insurance Premier League | Magnuson Park, Seattle |
| Seattle Seawolves | Rugby union | Major League Rugby | Starfire Stadium, Tukwila |
| Seattle Thunderbirds | Ice hockey | Western Hockey League | ShoWare Center, Kent |
| Spokane Chiefs | Ice hockey | Western Hockey League | Spokane Arena, Spokane |
| Spokane Indians | Baseball | Pacific Coast League (High-A) | Avista Stadium, Spokane |
| Spokane Velocity | Soccer | USL League One | One Spokane Stadium, Spokane |
| Spokane Zephyr FC | Soccer | USL Super League | One Spokane Stadium, Spokane |
| Tacoma Defiance | Soccer | MLS Next Pro | Cheney Stadium, Tacoma |
| Tacoma Rainiers | Baseball | Pacific Coast League (Triple-A) | Cheney Stadium, Tacoma |
| Tacoma Stars | Indoor soccer and Soccer | Major Arena Soccer League (indoor); USL League Two (outdoor) | ShoWare Center, Kent (indoor); Bellarmine Preparatory School, Tacoma |
| Tri-City Americans | Ice hockey | Western Hockey League | Toyota Center, Kennewick |
| Tri-City Dust Devils | Baseball | Pacific Coast League (High-A) | Gesa Stadium, Pasco |
| Wenatchee Wild | Ice hockey | Western Hockey League | Town Toyota Center, Wenatchee |
| West Seattle Junction FC | Soccer | USL League Two | Nino Cantu Southwest Athletics Complex, Seattle |

==== Four-year college sports teams ====
NCAA Division I

- Washington Huskies (Big Ten Conference; Football Bowl Subdivision)
- Washington State Cougars (Pac-12 Conference; Football Bowl Subdivision)
- Gonzaga Bulldogs (West Coast Conference)
- Seattle Redhawks (West Coast Conference)
- Eastern Washington Eagles (Big Sky Conference; Football Championship Subdivision)

NCAA Division II

- Central Washington Wildcats
- Saint Martin's Saints
- Seattle Pacific Falcons
- Western Washington Vikings

NCAA Division III

- Pacific Lutheran Lutes
- Puget Sound Loggers
- Whitman Blues
- Whitworth Pirates

NAIA

- Northwest University Eagles
- Evergreen State College Geoducks
- Walla Walla University Wolves

==== Individual sports ====
The Seattle Open Invitational golf tournament was part of the PGA Tour from the 1930s to the 1960s. The GTE Northwest Classic was part of the Senior PGA Tour from 1986 to 1995, and the Boeing Classic since 2005. In addition, the 2015 U.S. Open was held at Chambers Bay, and several major tournaments were held at Sahalee Country Club.

Pacific Raceways is a motorsports venue that has hosted the Northwest Nationals of the NHRA Mello Yello Drag Racing Series and a round of the Trans-Am Series.

The WTA Seattle tennis tournament was part of the WTA Tour from 1977 to 1982.

== Symbols, honors, and names ==
Four ships of the United States Navy, including two battleships, have been named USS Washington in honor of the state. Previous ships had held that name in honor of George Washington.

=== Unofficial state nickname ===
The state's nickname, "The Evergreen State", was proposed in 1890 by Charles T. Conover of Seattle. The name proved popular as the forests were full of evergreen trees and the abundance of rain keeps the shrubbery and grasses green throughout the year. Although the nickname is widely used by the state, appearing on vehicle license plates for instance, it has not been officially adopted. A 2023 bill in the state legislature to formally recognize it as the state nickname was passed by the senate but was returned to committee. The Evergreen State College, a state-funded institution in Olympia, also takes its name from this nickname.

=== State symbols ===
The state song is "Washington, My Home", the state bird is the Willow goldfinch, the state fruit is the apple, and the state vegetable is the Walla Walla sweet onion. The state dance, adopted in 1979, is the square dance. The state tree is the western hemlock. The state flower is the coast rhododendron. The state fish is the steelhead. The state folk song is "Roll On, Columbia, Roll On" by Woody Guthrie. The unofficial, but popularly accepted, state rock song is "Louie Louie".

The state grass is bluebunch wheatgrass. The state insect is the green darner dragonfly. The state gem is petrified wood. The state fossil is the Columbian mammoth. The state marine mammal is the orca. The state soil is Tokul soil. The state land mammal is the Olympic marmot. The state seal, featured in the state flag, was inspired by the unfinished portrait of President George Washington by Gilbert Stuart. The state sport is pickleball.

== Sister states – friendship agreements ==
Washington has relationships with many provinces, states, and other entities worldwide.

=== Sister states ===
- Jalisco, Mexico (1996)
- Hyogo Prefecture, Japan
- Jeollabuk-do, South Korea

==== Friendship agreements ====
- Sichuan, China
- Pangasinan, Philippines

== See also ==
- Index of Washington (state)-related articles
- Outline of Washington (state)

== Notes ==
| Preceded by Montana | List of U.S. states by date of admission to the Union; Admitted on November 11, 1889 (42nd) | Succeeded by Idaho |
