= List of English words of Persian origin =

This article is concerned with loanwords, that is, words in English that derive from Persian, either directly, or more often, from one or more intermediary languages.

Many words of Persian origin have made their way into the English language through different, often circuitous, routes. Some of them, such as "paradise", date to cultural contacts between the Persian people and the ancient Greeks or Romans and through Greek and Latin found their way to English. Persian as the second important language of Islam has influenced many languages in the Muslim world such as Arabic and Turkish, and its words have found their way beyond that region.

Iran (Persia) remained largely impenetrable to English-speaking travelers well into the 19th century. Iran was protected from Europe by overland trade routes that passed through territory inhospitable to foreigners, while trade at Iranian ports in the Persian Gulf was in the hands of locals. In contrast, intrepid English traders operated in Mediterranean seaports of the Levant from the 1570s, and some vocabulary describing features of Ottoman culture found their way into the English language. Thus many words in this list, though originally from Persian, arrived in English through the intermediary of the Ottoman Turkish language.

Many Persian words also came into English through Hindustani (Hindi-Urdu), Bengali and Punjabi during British colonialism. Persian was the language of the Mughal court before British rule in India even though locals in northern India (Hindustan) had their lingua franca as Hindustani.

Other words of Persian origin found their way into European languages—and eventually reached English at second-hand—through the Moorish-Christian cultural interface in the Iberian Peninsula during the Middle Ages thus being transmitted through Arabic.

== A ==
Algorithm
Etymology: The word algorithm is derived from the Latin translation, Algoritmi de numero Indorum, of the 9th-century Persian mathematician Muhammad ibn Musa al-Khwarizmi's arithmetic treatise “Al-Khwarizmi Concerning the Hindu Art of Reckoning.” More specifically, it is derived from al-Khwarizmi's nisba which is attained from the name of his home town, Khwarazm. The Arab geographer Yaqut al-Hamawi in his Muʿǧam al-buldan wrote that the name was a Persian compound of khwar (خوار), and razm (رزم), referring to the abundance of cooked fish as a main diet of the peoples of this area. C.E. Bosworth, however, believed the Persian name to be made up of xor (خور 'the sun') and zam (زم 'earth, land'), designating 'the land from which the sun rises'.
Alfalfa
Etymology: Spanish, from Arabic al-faṣfaṣa: al-, the + faṣfaṣa, alfalfa (variant of fiṣfiṣa, ultimately (probably via Coptic p-espesta: p-, masculine sing. definite article + espesta, alfalfa) from Aramaic espestā from Middle Persian aspast, horse fodder.

=== Alkekengi, alkakengi ===
Etymology: Middle English alkenkengy, from Medieval Latin alkekengi, from Arabic al-kākanj the ground-cherry, from Persian kākunaj. a Chinese lantern plant.

Amazons
via Old French (13c.) or Latin, from Greek Amazon (mostly in plural Amazones) "one of a race of female warriors in Scythia," possibly from an Iranian compound *ha-maz-an- "(one) fighting together". Or a borrowing from old Persian for a warring Scythian tribe ("ha-u-ma-va-r-(z)ga: 'lit. 'performing the Haoma plant ritual' "),

Assassin
The original word in Persian: اساسیان Asaasiaan which is in two parts. 'Asaas' [Arabic for Foundation/God] and 'iaan' [Persian adj. 'committed/plural'] is the common name used to refer to Nizari Ismailis under the leadership of Hassan-i Sabbah who conducted a series of political assassinations. It is a common misconception that they were called Hashashim, which is supposed to imply that they were drugged on Hashish to do their martyrdom, because the opposition of the Ismaili groups wanted to tarnish their name.
Azure
Middle English (denoting a blue dye): from Old French asur, azur, from medieval Latin azzurum, azolum, from Arabic al 'the' + lāzaward (from Persian lāžward 'lapis lazuli').:

Aubergine
Etymology: Catalan albergínia, from Arabic al-bādhinjān, from Persian Bādenjān بادنجان.

Azerbaijan
According to a modern etymology, the term Azerbaijan derives from the name of Atropates, a Persian satrap under the Achaemenid Empire, who was later reinstated as the satrap of Media under Alexander of Macedonia. The original etymology of this name is thought to have its roots in the once-dominant Zoroastrianism.

In Old Persian Azarbadgan or Azarbaygan means "The Land Protected By Holy Fire".

== B ==
Babouche
from French babouche and Arabic بابوش, from Persian pāpoosh (پاپوش), from pa "foot" + poosh "covering." a chiefly oriental slipper made without heel or quarters.
Babul
from Persian بابل bābul; akin to Sanskrit बब्बुल, बब्ब्ल babbula, babbla (Acacia arabica), an acacia tree (Acacia arabica) probably native to the Sudan that is widespread across northern Africa and parts of Asia including India.
Badian
from French badiane, from Persian بادیان bādiyān 'anise.'
Baghdad Bagh+dad
Yazata given.
Baksheesh
Etymology: from Persian bakhshesh (بخشش), lit. "gift," from verb بخشیدن bakhshidan "to give, to give in charity, to give mercifully; (hence, also) to forgive". A gift of money.
Balaghat
Etymology: probably from Hindi बालाघाट, from Persian بالا bālā 'above' + Hindi gaht 'pass.' tableland above mountain passes.
Baldachin
"Baldachin" (called Baldac in older times) was originally a luxurious type of cloth from Baghdad, from which name the word is derived, through Italian "Baldacchino".
Balkans (region)
Etymology: possibly from Persian balk 'mud' with Turkish suffix -an, or Persian بالا bālā 'big, high, upper, above' + خانه khāna 'house, upperhouse, room'.
Ban (title)
"governor of Croatia," from Croatian ban "lord, master, ruler," from Persian baan (بان) "prince, lord, chief, governor"
Barbican
Etymology: possibly from Persian (خانه khāneh "house").
Barsom
Etymology: from Persian برسم barsam, from Middle Persian برسم barsum, from Avestan بارسمان barsman. a bundle of sacred twigs or metal rods used by priests in Zoroastrian ceremonies.
Bazaar
Etymology: Persian bāzār, alteration of Middle Persian bāchār, from Old Persian abēcharish. a market place with stalls
Bazigar
Etymology: from Hindi: बाज़ीगर bazigar, from Persian: بازیگر. literally means a 'player' (< bāzi 'game, play' + participial suffix -gar; cf. English suffix -er, viz. "play-er") and it refers to a gypsylike nomadic Muslim people in India.
Bedeguar
Etymology: from Middle French bedegard, from Persian بادآورد baadaaward. gall like a moss produced on rosebushes (as the sweetbrier or eglantine) by a gall wasp (Rhodites rosae or related species)
Begar, begari
Etymology: from Hindi: बेगार begaar, from Persian: بیگار bi-gār. Meaning forced labor.
Belleric
Etymology: from French: Bellérique, from Arabic: بالعلاج balilaj, from Persian بلیله balilah, the fruit of the bahera.
Bellum
Etymology: modification of Persian بالم balam. a Persian-gulf boat holding about eight persons and propelled by paddles or poles.
Benami
Etymology: be(बे) means 'not' or 'without'. Hindi बेनाम benaam, from Persian بنام banaam in the name of + i. made, held, done, or transacted in the name of.
Bezoar
Etymology: from pād-zahr (پادزهر) antidote. Any of various concretions found in the alimentary organs (especially of certain ruminants) formerly believed to possess magical properties and used in the Orient as a medicine or pigment.
Bheesty
Etymology: from Persian بهشت bihisht heavenly one. India: a water carrier especially of a household or a regiment.
Bhumidar
from Hindi भुमिदर bhumidar, from भूमि bhumi earth, land (from Sanskrit भूमि bhuumi also Persian بومی Bumi and Old Persian 𐏏 Bum) + در dar holder (from Persian). India: a landholder having full title to his land.
Bildar
Etymology: Hindi बेलदार beldar, from Persian بیلدر bildaar, from بیل bil spade + در -dar holder. Digger, Excavator.
Biryani
Etymology: Hindi, or Urdu बिरयान biryaan from Persian بریان beryaan. roasted, grilled. Also an Indian dish containing meat, fish, or vegetables and rice flavored with saffron or turmeric.
Bobachee
Etymology: Hindi बाबर्ची babarchi, from Persian باوارچی bawarchi. India: a male cook
Bolor
Etymology: Mongolian Болор Bolour, from Persian بلور Booloor. Mongolian, Persian: Crystal
Bombast
Etymology: modification of Middle French bombace, from Medieval Latin 'bombac-, bombax' cotton, from Greek βόμβυκ bombyk-, βόμβυξ bombyx silkworm, silk garment, probably of Persian origin; akin to Persian پمپا pamba cotton. A pretentious inflated style of speech or writing.
Borax
Etymology: Via Middle English boras, Anglo-Norman boreis, Medieval Latin baurach, and Arabic بورق báuraq; ultimately from Persian بره burah or Middle Persian būrak. the best-known sodium borate Na_{2}B_{4}O_{7}·10H_{2}O
Bostanji
Etymology: Turkish bostanci, literally, gardener, from bostan garden, from Persian بوستان bustaan flower or herb garden, from بو bo fragrance + ستان -stan place. one of the imperial guards of Turkey whose duties include protecting the palace and its grounds, rowing the sultan's barge, and acting as imperial gardeners
Brinjal
Etymology: from Persian بادینگان badingaan, probably from Sanskrit वातिगगम vaatingana. Eggplant.
Buckshee
Etymology: Hindi बक्षिस bakhsis, from Persian بخشش bakhshish. a gift or gratuity.
Budmash
Etymology: Persian بدمش badma'sh immoral, from باد bad (from Middle Persian vat) + مش ma'sh (Arabic) living, life. India: a bad character: a worthless person.
Bakshi
Etymology: Persian بخشی bakhshi, literally, giver, from bakhshidan to give. India: a military paymaster.
bulbul
Etymology: Persian, borrowed from Arabic بلبل ("nightingale"). A Persian songbird frequently mentioned in poetry that is a nightingale; A maker or singer of sweet songs.
Bund
Etymology: Hindi बंद band, from Persian. An embankment used especially in India to control the flow of water.
Bunder Boat
Etymology: Hindi बन्दर bandar harbor, landing-place, from Persian. a coastal and harbor boat in the Far East.
Bundobust
Etymology: Hindi बंद-ओ-बसत band-o-bast, literally, tying and binding, from Persian. India: arrangement or settlement of details.
Burkundaz
Etymology: Hindi बर्क़न्द्ज़ barqandz, from Persian, from برق barq lightning (from Arabic) + انداز andāz thrower. an armed guard or policeman of 18th and 19th century India.
Buzkashi
from Persian بز buz "goat" + کشی kashi "dragging"

== C ==
Cafcuh
from Persian qâfkuh (قاف‌کوه) or kuh-e qâf (کوه قاف)
Calabash
possibly from Persian kharabuz, Kharbuzeh (خربزه) melon.
Calean
Etymology: Persian قلیان qalyaan. a Persian water pipe.
Calender or qalandar (dervish order)
Etymology: Persian قلندر qalandar, from Arabic كالندر, and from Persian قلندر kalandar uncouth man. one of a Sufic order of wandering mendicant dervishes.
Camaca
Etymology: Middle English, from Middle French camocas or Medieval Latin camoca, from Arabic & Persian كمخه کمکها kamkha, kimkha. a medieval fabric prob. of silk and camel's hair used for draperies and garments.
Candy
from Old French sucre candi, via Arabic قند qandi "candied," derived from Persian قند qand, meaning "sugar." Probably ultimately derived from Sanskrit खुड् khanda sugar, perhaps from Dravidian.
Carafe
from Arabic gharafa (قرافه), "to pour"; or from Persian qarabah, (قرابه) "a large flagon"
Caravan
Etymology: Italian caravana, carovana, from Persian کاروان kāravān. a company of travelers, pilgrims, or merchants on a long journey through desert or hostile regions: a train of pack animals.
Caravansary
Etymology: modification of Persian کاروانسرا kārwānsarā, from کاروان kārwān caravan + سرا sarā palace, large house, inn; an inn in eastern countries where caravans rest at night that is commonly a large bare building surrounding a court.
Carcass
Etymology: Middle French carcasse, alteration of Old French carcois, perhaps from carquois, carquais quiver, alteration of tarquais, from Medieval Latin tarcasius, from Arabic تركیزه tarkash, from Persian ترکش tirkash, from تیر tir arrow (from Old Persian 𐎫𐎡𐎦𐎼𐎠 tigra pointed) + کاش -kash bearing (from کشدن kashdan to pull, draw, from Avestan کارش karsh-); another possibility is that the word derives from Persian کرکس, the word for 'vulture'.
Carcoon
Etymology: Marathi कारकुन kaarkun, from Persian کارکن kaarkon manager, from کار kaar work, business + کن -kon doer. India: CLERK.
Cassock
Etymology: Middle French casaque, from Persian کاژاغند kazhaghand padded jacket, from کژ، کاج kazh, kaj raw silk + اند aaghand stuffed. a long loose coat or gown formerly worn by men and women.
Caviar
from Fr. caviar, from Pers. khaviyar (خاویار), from خیا khaya "egg"+ در dar "bearing, holder".
Ceterach
Medieval Latin ceterah, from Arabic شتاراج shtaraj, from Persian شیتاراخ shitarakh. A small genus of mainly Old World ferns (family Polypodiaceae) typified by the scale fern
Chador
Hindi चद्दर caddar, from Persian چادر chaddar. a large cloth used as a combination head covering, veil, and shawl usually by women among Muslim and Hindu peoples especially in India and Iran.
Chakar
Hindi चकोर chakor, from Persian چاکر chaker. India: a person in domestic service: SERVANT; also: a clerical worker.
Chakdar
From Panjabi ਛਕ੍ਦਰ੍ chakdar, from ਛ‌ਕ੍ chak tenure (from Sanskrit चक्र cakra wheel) + Persian -در -dar having. a native land tenant of India intermediate in position between the proprietor and cultivator.
Chalaza
Old Slavic zledica frozen rain, Ancient Greek χάλαζα chalaza hailstone or lump, Persian ژاله zhaala hail. Either of a pair of spiral bands of thickened albuminous substance in the white of a bird's egg that extend out from opposite sides of the yolk to the ends of the egg and are there attached to the lining membrane.
Chappow
Persian چپو Chapu pillage or چاپل Chapaul raid. Word is Mongolian in Origin. Pillage/Raid.
Charka
Hindi कारखा carkha, from Persian چرخا, چرخ charkha, charkh wheel, from Middle Persian chark; akin to Avestan chaxra- wheel, Sanskrit cakra. Wheel. a domestic spinning wheel used in India chiefly for cotton.
Charpoy
From Persian چهار-پای Char-pai. Literally meaning four-footed. a bed consisting of a frame strung with tapes or light rope used especially in India.
Chawbuck
Hindi चाबुक cabuk, from Persian چابک chabuk archaic, chiefly India: a large whip.
Check (and Cheque)
check (cheque) (n.) from O.Fr. eschequier "a check at chess," from eschec, from V.L. *scaccus, from shah "king," the principal piece in a chess game (see shah). 1st Sassanid Empire. When the king is in check a player's choices are limited. Meaning widened from chess to general sense of "adverse event, sudden stoppage" and by c.1700 to (from Persian 'chak' (چَك)"a token used to check against loss or theft" (surviving in hat check) and "a check against forgery or alteration," which gave the modern financial use of "bank check, money draft" (first recorded 1798), probably influenced by exchequeur. Check-up "careful examination" is 1921, American English, on notion of a checklist of things to be examined.
Checkmate
from Middle French eschec mat, from Persian شاه مات shâh mât (="the King ("Shah") is dead")
Chess
from Russian Шах Shach, from Persian شاه shah ("the King"), an abbreviation of شاه-مات Shâh-mât (Checkmate).
Cheyney
Etymology: probably from Persian چینی chini literally meaning Chinese. a woolen fabric in use during the 17th and 18th centuries.
Chick
Hindi सिक ciq, from Persian چیق chiq. a screen used in India and southeast Asia especially for a doorway and constructed of bamboo slips loosely bound by vertical strings and often painted.
Chillum
Etymology: Hindi चिलम cilam, from Persian چلم chilam.

Chillumchee
Etymology: Hindi सिलाम्ची cilamci, from Persian چیلمچی chilamchi. India: a metal wash basin.
China
From Chinese 秦 (referring to the Qin dynasty), Sanskrit चीन Chinas, and Latin; Modification (influenced by China, the country) of Persian چین Cin (Chinese) porcelain.: Also, Japan and Korea are repeatedly referred as "MaaChin" in old Persian literature that literally means "beyond China".
Chinar
Hindi चिनार chinar, from Persian چنار chanar. A type of Oriental tree.
Chobdar
Hindi कोब्दर cobdar. From Persian چوبر chubar. from چوب chub, chub staff, wood (from Middle Persian چپ chup wood) + در -dar having.
Cinnabar
probably from Persian زنجیفرح zanjifrah
Coomb
Middle English combe, from Old English cumb, a liquid measure; akin to Middle Low German kump bowl, vessel, Middle High German kumpf bowl, Persian گمبد/گنبد gumbed(Gonbad). an English unit of capacity equal to 4 imperial bushels or 4.13 United States bushels.

=== Culgee; ===
Etymology: Hindi कलगी kalgi, from Persian کلگی kalgi jeweled plume. a jeweled plume worn in India on the turban.

Cummerbund
Etymology: from Hindi कमरबंद kamarband (كمربند), from Persian کمر kamar (="waist") + بند band (="band")
Cushy
Etymology: modification of Hindi खुश khush pleasant, from Persian خوش khush.

== D ==
Daeva
daeva, deva from Avestan daevo; dev from Persian دو deev. Zoroastrianism: a maleficent supernatural being: an evil spirit.
dafadar
From Persian دافءادار Daf'adaar. from Arabic دافئه daf'ah time, turn + Persian در -dar holder.
Daftar
Hindi दफ्तर, record, office, from Persian دفتر Daftar, from Arabic دفتر daftar, diftar, from Aramaic דהפתּיר defter and Greek διφθέρα diphthera prepared hide, parchment, leather.
Daftardar
Etymology: Hindi दफ्तरदार daftardar, from Persian دافءادار, finance officer, from دفتر daftar + دار -dar holder.
Dakhma
Etymology: Persian دخمه, from Middle Persian dakhmak, from Avestan daxma- funeral place.
Daroga
Etymology: Hindi दरोगा daroga, from Persian درگا daaroga. India: a chief officer; especially: the head of a police, customs, or excise station.
Darvesh
Persian درویش darvish.
Darzi
Hindi दर्जी darzi, from Persian درزی Darzi. A tailor or an urban caste of tailors in Hindu society in India.
Dastur
Hindi दस्तूर dastur custom, from Persian دستور Dastur. customary fee.
Dastur
From Persian دستور Dastur. a Parsi high priest.
Dasturi
Hindi दस्तूरी Dasturi from Persian دستور Dastur. Gratuity.
Defterdar
Turkish, from Persian دفتردار daftardar finance officer. a Turkish government officer of finance; specifically: the accountant general of a province.
Dehwar
Persian دهور dehwar=دیه Dih(land)+ور war (having possession of).: a member of the Dehwar racial type usually having the status of a laborer or slave.
Delhi
Deli means favorite in Farsi, from Del
Dervish
from Persian درویش Darvish Middle Persian دروش Darweesh. a member of any Muslim religious fraternity of monks or mendicants noted for its forms of devotional exercises
Dewan
Etymology: Hindi दीवान diwan, from Persian دوان, account book.
Demitasse
Etymology: from Fr. demi-tasse, lit. "half-cup," from demi- + tasse, an O.Fr. borrowing from Arabic تصح tassah, from Pers. تشت tasht "cup, saucer".
Div
See the Entry Daeva above.
Divan
Etymology: via French and Turkish divan, from Persian دیوان dēvān (="place of assembly", "roster"), from Old Persian دیپی dipi (="writing, document") + واهانم vahanam (="house")
Doab
Etymology: Persian دواب doab, from دو do two (from Middle Persian) + آب -ab water. a tract of land between two rivers: an interfluve.
Dolphin
Etymology: from Persian درفیل (Dorfil), meaning sea elephant.
Dogana
Etymology: from Persian دوگانه, account book. an Italian customhouse.
Douane
Etymology: from Persian دیوان Divan. CUSTOMHOUSE.
Dubber
Etymology: from Persian دبا Dabba. a large globular leather bottle used in India to hold ghee, oil, or other liquid.
Duftery
Etymology: from دفتر Dafter (Record)+ی i. A servant in an office whose duty is to dust and bind records, rule paper, make envelopes, an office boy.
Dumba
Etymology: Persian, from دمب dumb tail. a fat-tailed sheep of Bokhara and the Kirghiz steppe that furnishes astrakhan.
Durbar
Etymology: Persian, from در dar door + بار baar door, admission, audience. admission, audience of the king.
Durwan
Etymology: Persian درون darwan, from در dar door (from Middle Persian, from Old Persian دور duvar-) + Persian وان -wan keeping, guarding.
Dustuck
Etymology: Hindi दस्तक dastak, from Persian دستک Dastak (handle, related to hand).

== E ==
Emblic
Etymology: New Latin emblica, from Arabic أملج amlaj, from Persian املاحaamlah. an East Indian tree (Phyllanthus emblica) used with other myrobalans for tanning.

Inamdar
Etymology: Hindi इन'आमदार in'aamdaar, from Persian, from یناءم ina'm (originally Arabic meaning Gift) + در -dar holder. the holder of an enam (Gifts).

Euphrates
Etymology: From Old Persian Ufratu "Good to cross over"

== F ==
Fairy

Possibly of Persian origin. See entry for "Peri" below

Farsakh
Etymology: Arabic فرسخ farsakh, from Persian farsang فرسنگ, from earlier parsang پرسنگ, a Persian metric unit approximately 6 kilometers or 3.75 miles.
Faujdar
Etymology: Hindi फव्ज्दार Fawjdaar from Persian, from Arabic فوج Fawj Host (troops) + Persian دار daar (holder). petty officer (as one in charge of police).
Faujdari
Etymology: from Persian, from فوجدار fawjdar. a criminal court in India.
Feraghan
Etymology: from Persian فرغانه Ferghana. a region in Central Asia. a usually small heavy Persian rug chiefly of cotton having usually a web and a fringed end, a deep blue or rose field with an all over herati sometimes guli hinnai design and a main border with a turtle design, and being highly prized if antique.
Feringhee
Etymology: from Persian 'Farangi'- فرنگی -: from the word Frankish: a person from Europe. The first encounter with Western Europe was during Charlemagne who was King of Franks. From that time the word Farangi means European, especially Western European. Also after the first Crusade this word appeared frequently in Persian and Arabic literature. (in Arabic as 'Faranji' because they could not pronounce /g/) . The Ottoman Turks pronounced it as Feringhee.
Fers
Etymology: Middle English, from Middle French fierce, from Arabic فرزان farzan, from Persian فرزین farzin. Coming from "Fares" a name given by Muslims to the Sassanid era cavalry.
Fida'i
Etymology: Arabic فيضة fida (sacrifice) plus Persian suffix 'i'. فدایی, a member of an Ismaili order of assassins known for their willingness to offer up their lives in order to carry out delegated assignments of murdering appointed victims.
Firman
Etymology: from Persian ferman فرمان, from Old Persian framaanaa, a decree or mandate, order, license, or grant issued by the ruler of an Oriental country.;

== G ==
Gatch
Etymology: from Persian گچ (Gach), a plaster used especially in Persian architectural ornamentation.
Galingale
Etymology: from Persian خلنجان khalanjan, a plant.
Ghorkhar
Etymology: from Persian گوره‌خر (Gure Khar), a wild ass of northwestern India believed to be identical with the onager.
Giaour
Etymology: from Persian گور gaur, variant of gabr "fire-worshipper"
Gigerium
Etymology: from Latin gigeria, plural, entrails of fowl, perhaps of Iranian origin; akin to Persian جگر jigar liver.
Gizzard
Etymology: from earlier gysard, alteration of gysar, from Middle English giser, gyser, from Old North French guisier liver (especially of a fowl), gizzard, modification of Latin gigeria (neuter plural) cooked entrails of poultry, perhaps of Iranian origin; akin to Persian جگر jigar liver;
Gul
Etymology: Persian Gol/Gul گل. Rose.
Gulhinnai
Etymology: Persian گلی حنا guli hinna, from Persian گل gul flower, rose + Arabic هنا/حنة hinna/henna. a Persian rug design consisting of a plant with central stem and attached star flowers.
Gulmohar
Etymology: Hindi गुलमोहर gulmohur, from Persian جعل gul rose, flower + مهر muhr seal, gold coin.
Gunge
Etymology: Hindi गज gãj, of Iranian origin; akin to Persian گنج ganj treasure.
Gymkhana
Etymology: probably modification (influenced by English gymnasium) of Hindi गेंद-खाना gend-khana racket court, from Persian خانه khana house. a meet or festival featuring sports contests or athletic skills: as a: a horseback-riding meet featuring games and novelty contests (as musical chairs, potato spearing, bareback jumping).

== H ==
Halalcor
Hindi हलालखोर halalkhor, from Persian, from Arabic حلال halal + Persian خور khor eating. a person in Iran and India to whom any food is lawful.:
Hash
Comes from "Hashish" (حشیش) that means "weed derived drugs" in Persian.
Havildar
Hindi हवालदार hawaldar, from Arabic حول 'hawala' charge + Persian در 'dar' having. a noncommissioned officer in the Indian army corresponding to a sergeant.
Hyleg
modification of Persian حلاج hailaj 'material body'. The astrological position of the planets at the time of birth
Hindi
from Persian Hindu, derived from सिन्धु Sindhu, the Sanskrit name for the Indus River. literary language of northern India usually written in the Devanagari alphabet and one of the official languages of the Republic of India.
Hindu
from medieval Persian word هندو Hindu (mod. هندی Hendi), from ancient Avestan hendava ultimately from Sanskrit सैन्धव saindhava. "Indian"
Hindustan
Hindi हिंदुस्तान Hindustan, from Persian هندوستان Hindustan (mod. هندوستان Hendustan) India.
Hircarrah
Persian هارکارا harkara, from har every, all (from Old Persian haruva-) + kaar work, deed, from Middle Persian, from Old Persian kar- to do, make.
Homa
hom from Persian هم hom, from Avestan haoma. a stylized tree pattern originating in Mesopotamia as a symbol of the tree of life and used especially in Persian textiles.

== I ==
India
from Persian هند Hind, from Sanskrit सिन्धु Sindu, a river, in particular, the river Indus.
Iran
from Middle Persian ایر Ir (Aryan, Aria, Areia) + ان an (place)
Ispaghol
literally, horse's ear, from اسپ asp horse (from Middle Persian) + قول ghol ear. an Old World plantain (Plantago ovata) with mucilaginous seeds that are used in preparing a beverage.

== J ==
Jackal
from Persian شغال shaghāl, ultimately from Sanskrit शृगाल sṛgālaḥ. Any of several doglike mammals of the genus Canis of Africa and southern Asia that are mainly foragers feeding on plants, small animals, and occasionally carrion.
Jagir
from Persian جا Ja (place) + گیر gir (keeping, holding). a grant of the public revenues of a district in northern India or Pakistan to a person with power to collect and enjoy them and to administer the government in the district.
Jama
from Persian جامه Jama (garment). a long-sleeved cotton coat of at least knee length worn by men in northern India and Pakistan. Also used as suffix in the word Pajama.
Jasmine
from یاسمین yasmin, the name of a climbing plant with fragrant flowers.
Jemadar
Hindi जमा'दर, जामदार jama'dar, jam'dar (influenced in meaning by Persian جامءات jam'at body of troops), from Arabic جاما jam' collections, assemblage + Persian در dar having. an officer in the army of India having a rank corresponding to that of lieutenant in the English army. Any of several police or other officials of the government of India.
Jasper
The name means "spotted or speckled stone", and is derived via Old French jasrpe (variant of Anglo-Norman jaspe) and Latin iaspidem (nom. iaspis)) from Greek ἴασπις iaspis, (feminine noun) from a Semitic language (cf. Hebrew ישפה yashepheh, Akkadian ܝܫܦܗ yashupu), related to Persian یشپ yašp.
Jezail
Persian جزاءیل jaza'il. a long heavy Afghan rifle.
Jujube
Greek ζίζυφον zizyphon, Persian زیزفون zayzafun, an Asiatic tree with datelike fruit.
Jungle
The word jungle originates from the Sanskrit word jaṅgala (Sanskrit: जङ्गल), meaning rough and arid. It came into the English language via Hindi in the 18th century. It is more relevant that its cognate word in Urdu derived from Persian, جنگل (Jangal), did refer to forests.
Julep
from گلاب gulab (rose(گل gul)-water(آب āb)).

== K ==
Kebab
or kabob, possibly from Persian kabab کباب, or from identical forms in Arabic and Urdu
Kabuli
Persian کابلی kabuli, of or belonging to Kabul, Afghanistan.
Kaftan
from Persian خفتان khaftân.
Kajawah
from Persian کجاوه (Kajavah/Kajawah). a pannier used in pairs on camels and mules especially in India.
Kala-Azar
from Hindi कला kala (black) + Persian آذر āzār (disease, pain). a severe infectious disease chiefly of eastern and southern Asia that is marked by fever, progressive anemia, leukopenia, and enlargement of the spleen and liver and is caused by a flagellate (Leishmania donovani) which is transmitted by the bite of sand flies (genus Phlebotomus) and which proliferates in reticuloendothelial cells – called also visceral leishmaniasis.
Kamboh
Etymology: Unabridged Merriam-Webster Dictionary defines Kamboh as "a member of a low caste in the Punjab engaged chiefly in agriculture".
Karez
Etymology: کارز kârez an underground irrigation tunnel bored horizontally into rock slopes in Baluchistan. A system of irrigation by tunnels.
Kemancha
Etymology: from Persian کمانچه Kamancheh. a violin popular in Middle East, Caucus and Central Asia. It has usually a single string and a gourd resonator and is held vertically when played.
Kerana
Etymology: modification of Persian karranâi کرنای, from نی nâi, reed, reed pipe. a long Persian trumpet.
Kenaf
Etymology: Persian. a valuable fiber plant (Hibiscus cannabinus) of the East Indies now widespread in cultivation.
Khaki
from Hindustani and Urdu ख़ाकी/خاکی khaki (="made from soil", "dusty" or "of the colour of soil"), from Persian خاک khak (= "soil")
Khakhsar
Etymology: Hindi खाकसार khâksâr, from Persian khâkâsr خاکسار humble, probably from khâk dust + -sâr like. a member of a militant Muslim nationalist movement of India.
Khan
Etymology: Arabic خان khân, from Persian, a caravansary or rest house in some Asian countries, also defined the Turko-Mongol title Khan that was adapted to Persian language.
Khankah
Etymology: Hindi खानकाह khânaqâh, from Persian خانه khâna house + گاه gâh place.
Khawaja
Etymology: originally from Persian khâwja خواجه. used as a title of respect.
Khidmatgar
from Arabic خدمة khidmah service + Persian گر -gar (suffix denoting possession or agency). In India: a male waiter
Khoja
see khawaja
Khuskhus
Etymology: Persian & Hindi खसखस/خسخس khaskhas. an aromatic grass (Andropogon zizamoides) whose especially fragrant roots yield an oil used in perfumery and are also made into mats in tropical India – called also vetiver.
Kincob
Etymology: Hindi किमखाब, कमख्वाब kimkhab, kamkhwab, from Persian. an Indian brocade usually of gold or silver or both.
Kiosk
Etymology: from Turkish from Persian کوشک kushk (="palace, portico, pavilion") or Middle Persian gōšak "corner"
Koftgari
Etymology: Hindi कोफ्त्गर koftgar, from Persian کوفتگری koftgari, from کوفت koft blow, beating + گر -gar doing. Indian damascene work in which steel is inlaid with gold.
Koh-i-Noor
Etymology: 'mountain of light' from Persian koh کوه "mountain" نور noor (light)." Famous diamond that became part of the British crown jewels after the annexation of the Punjab by the United Kingdom in 1849.

=== Koomkie ===
Etymology: Hindi kumakī helper, from Persian. a trained and usually female elephant used in India to decoy and train wild male elephants

Kotwal
Etymology: Hindi कोतवाल kotwal, from Persian. a chief police officer or town magistrate in India.
Kotwalee
Etymology: Hindi कोतवाल kotwal, from Persian, from کوتوله kotwalee. a police station in India.
Kran
Etymology: Persian قران qran. the basic monetary unit of Persia from 1826 to 1932. a silver coin representing one kran.
Kurta
Etymology: Hindi & Urdu कुरता کُرتا kurta, from Persian کرتا kurtâ. a loose-fitting collarless shirt.
Kusti
Etymology: Persian کستی، کشتی kusti, kushti, from کشت kusht waist, side, from Middle Persian کست، کوستک kust, kustak. the sacred cord or girdle worn by Parsis as a mark of their faith – compare.

== L ==
Lac
Etymology: Persian لک lak and Hindi लाख lakh. Resinous substance secreted by the lac insect and used chiefly in the form of shellac. Any of various plant or animal substances that yield hard coatings resembling lac and shellac.
Lamasery
Etymology: French lamaserie, from lama + -serie (from Persian سرای sarāi palace, large house).
Larin
Etymology: Persian لاری lārī. a piece of silver wire doubled over and sometimes twisted into the form of a fishhook that was formerly used as money in parts of Asia.
Lascar
Etymology: Urdu lashkarī < Pers, equiv. to لاسخار lashkar army + -ī suffix of appurtenance. an East Indian sailor. Anglo-Indian. an artilleryman.
Lasque
Etymology: perhaps from Persian لاشک lashk bit, piece. a flat thin diamond usually cut from an inferior stone and used especially in Hindu work.
Lemon
Origin: 1350–1400; 1905–10 for def. 4; < ML lemōnium; r. ME lymon < ML līmō, (s. līmōn-) < Pers لیمو، لیمون līmū, the yellowish, acid fruit of a subtropical citrus tree, Citrus limon. According to www.dictionary.com: Although we know neither where the lemon was first grown nor when it first came to Europe, we know from its name that it came to us from the Middle East because we can trace its etymological path. One of the earliest occurrences of our word is found in a Middle English customs document of 1420–1421. The Middle English word limon goes back to Old French limon, showing that yet another delicacy passed into England through France. The Old French word probably came from Italian limone, another step on the route that leads back to the Arabic word ليمون، ليمون laymūn or līmūn, which comes from the Persian word لیمو līmū.
Lilac
from Pers. لیلک lilak, variant of نیلک nilak "bluish," from नील nil "indigo"
Lungī
Hindi लुंगी lungī, from Persian. a usually cotton cloth used especially in India, Bangladesh, Pakistan, and Burma for articles of clothing (as sarongs, skirts, and turbans).
Laari
Etymology: probably from Divehi (Indo-Aryan language of the Maldive Islands) ލާރި, from Persian ا lr piece of silver wire used as currency, from Lārī, town in S Persia where the currency was first minted. a Maldivian monetary unit equal to 1/100 rufiyaa. a coin representing one laari.

== M ==
Magic
Middle English magik, from Middle French magique, from Latin magicus, from Greek magikos (μαγικός), from magos magus, wizard, sorcerer (of Iranian origin; akin to Old Persian magush sorcerer). of or relating to the occult: supposedly having supernatural properties or powers.
Magus, magi
from magus, from Old Persian maguš "mighty one", Priest of Zoroastrianism. A member of the Zoroastrian priestly caste of the Medes and Persians. Magus in the New Testament, one of the wise men from the East, traditionally held to be three, who traveled to Bethlehem to pay homage to the infant Jesus.
Malguzar
Hindi मालगुजार malguzar, from Arabic مال mal property, rent + Persian گزار guzar payer. Equivalent to Malik in India.
Manichaean
Latin Manichaeus member of the Manichaean sect (from Late Greek Μανιχαίος Manichaios, from Manichaios Manes died ab276A.D. Persian sage who founded the sect) + English -an. of or relating to Manichaeism or the Manichaeans. characterized by or reflecting belief in Manichaeism. Manichaeism was founded by Mani.
Manticore
from O. Pers. word for "man eater," cf. مارتی martiya- "man" + root of خور khor- "to eat". a legendary animal having the head of a man often with horns, the body of a lion, and the tail of a dragon or scorpion.
Margaret
The common female first name, is derived from the Old Persian word for pearl *margārīta-, via French (Marguerite), Latin (Margarita), and Greek Margarites (compare Modern Persian morvārīd "pearl")
Markhor
Persian مار mār (snake) + خور khōr (eating), consuming (from khōrdan to eat, consume). a wild goat (Capra falconieri) of mountainous regions from Afghanistan to India.
Masala
Persian مصالح is plural form of "moslah" which is a medicine that removes the side effects of a drug., For example, salt is "mosleh" for cucumber in Tibb.
Mazdak
Name of Persian reformer of Zoroastrian Faith.
Mazdakite
from مزدک Mazdak (of belonging to Mazda), 5th century A.D. Persian religious reformer + English ite. a member of the sect of Mazdak.
Mazdoor
Hindi मजदूर mazdur, from Persian مزدور muzdur. an Indian laborer.
Mehmandar
Persian مهماندار mihmāndār, from میهمان mihmān guest (from Middle Persian مهمان mehmān) + در -dār holder. an official in India, Persia, or Afghanistan appointed to escort an ambassador or traveler.
Mehtar
Persian مهتر mihtar prince, greater, elder, from mih great (from Middle Persian meh, mas) + -tar, comparative suffix (from Middle Persian, from Old Persian -tara-). A groom
Mesua
New Latin, from Johannes Mesuë (Arabic يوحنا بن ماسويه Yuhanna ibn-Masawayah) died 857 Persian Christian physician Masawayah in the service of the Caliph. a genus of tropical Asiatic trees (family Guttiferae) having large solitary flowers with a 2-celled ovary.
Mezereon
Middle English mizerion, from Medieval Latin mezereon, from Arabic مزارعين mazariyun, from Persian کشاورزان. a small European shrub (Daphne mezereum) with fragrant lilac purple flowers that appear before the leaves, an acrid bark used in medicine, and a scarlet fruit sometimes used as an adulterant of black pepper.
Mirza
Persian میرزا mirza, literally, son of a lord. a common title of honor in Persia prefixed to the surname of a person of distinction.
Mithra
from the name of the Persian God Mithra.
Mithraeum
from Persian مطهرا Mithra
Mithraism
from Persian مطهرا Mithra
Mobed
a Parsi priest. The word is cognate with Magian and Magus.
Mogul
from مغول mughul (="Mongolian")
Mohur
Hindi मुहर muhur, muhr gold coin, seal, from Persian مهر muhr; an old gold coin of the Moguls that circulated in India from the 16th century. any one of several gold coins formerly issued by Indian states (as Bikaner, Gwalior, Hyderabad) and by Nepal and Tibet.
Mummy
Middle English mummie, from Middle French momie, from Medieval Latin mumia, from Arabic موميياه mumiyah mummy, bitumen, from Persian موم mum wax. a concoction formerly used as a medicament or drug containing powdered parts of a human or animal body.
Murra
Etymology: Latin, probably of Iranian origin like Greek μόρρηία μὖρρα morrhia murra; akin to Persian مری mori, muri little glass ball. a material thought to be of semiprecious stone or porcelain used to make costly vessels in ancient Rome.
Musk
Etymology: from Middle English muske, Middle French musc, Late Latin Muscus, and Late Greek μόσχος (moschos), ultimately from Middle Persian مسک musk, from Sanskrit मुस्कस् muska (="testicle") from diminutive of मुस mus (="mouse"). a substance that has a penetrating persistent odor, that is obtained from a sac situated under the skin of the abdomen of the male musk deer, that when fresh in the pods is brown and unctuous and when dried is a grainy powder, that varies in quality according to the season and age of the animal, and that is used chiefly in the form of a tincture as a fixative in perfumes
Musth
Etymology: Hindi मस्त mast intoxicated, ruttish, from Persian مَست mast; akin to Sanskrit मदति madati he rejoices, is drunk. a periodic state of murderous frenzy of the bull elephant usually connected with the rutting season and marked by the exudation of a dark brown odorous ichor from tiny holes above the eyes- on must also in must: in a state of belligerent fury – used of the bull elephant.

=== Mussalchee ===
Etymology: Hindi mashʽalcī, from Persian, from Arabic mashʽal toch + Turkish -ci. a kitchen servant

Mussulman
Etymology: from Persian مسلمان musulman (adj.), from Arabic مسلم Muslim (q.v.) + Persian adj. suffix -an.

== N ==
Naan
Etymology: Hindi + Urdu + Punjabi + Persian नान/نان/ ਨਾਨ/نان nan bread; Hindi + Urdu nan, from Persian nan; akin to Baluchi nayan bread, Sogdian nyny. a round or oblong flat leavened bread especially of the Indian subcontinent.
Nakhuda
Etymology: Persian ناخدا nākhudā, from ناو nāv boat (from Old Persian) + خدا khudā master, from Middle Persian khutāi. a master of a native vessel.
Namaz
Etymology: Persian نماز namāz. akin to Sanskrit नमस् namas obeisance. Islamic worship or prayer.
Naphtha
Latin, from Greek: Νάφθα, of Iranian origin; akin to Avestan napta moist, Persian neft naphtha; from Persian naft "naphtha". perhaps akin to Greek nephos cloud, mist. petroleum especially when occurring in any of its more volatile varieties.
Nargil
Origin: 1830–40; < Turk nargile < Pers نارگیله nārgīleh, deriv. of نارگیل nārgīl coconut, from which the bowl was formerly made.
Nauruz
Persian نوروز nowruz. literally, new day, from "now" new + ruz. the Persian New Year's Day celebrated at the vernal equinox as a day of great festivity.
Nay
Etymology: Arabic ناي nay, from Persian: نی. a vertical end-blown flute of ancient origin used in Muslim lands.
Neftgil
Etymology: German, from Persian نفتداگیل نفتها naftdagil naphtha clay
Numdah
Etymology: Hindi नंदा namda, from Persian نماد namad, from Middle Persian نامت namat; akin to Avestan namata. a thick felted rug of India and Persia usually made of pounded goat's hair and embroidered with bird or floral designs in colored wool yarn Morphed into numnah to mean a thick cloth pad placed under a horse's saddle.
Nuristani
Etymology: Persian nuristan نورستان (Parsi نور Noorr+Persian عشتا Istan(Place)), from Nuristan, region of northeastern Afghanistan.

== O ==
Orange
from Milanese narans (from Old French orenge, Italian arancia, and Spanish naranja), from Medieval Latin pomum de orange, in Arabic نارَنج nāranj, from Persian نارَنگ nārange, from Sanskrit नारङ्ग nāraṅga, from Tamil narrankai, the "pungent fruit": Orange (the color) comes from "nāranjy" in Persian that means "colored like nārange" and the tangerine fruit is called nārangy (نارَنگی).

== P ==
Padishah
Origin: 1605–15; < Pers (poetical form), equiv. to پدی pādi- (earlier پاتی pati) lord + شاه shāh. More on Etymology: Persian پادشاه pādishah, from Middle Persian پاتاخشاه pātakhshah, from Old Persian پاتی pati + کشی xshay- to rule; akin to Avestan xshayeti. great king; emperor (a title applied esp. formerly to the shah of Iran, the sultan of Turkey, and to the British sovereign as emperor in India).
Pagoda
via Portuguese pagode, from a corruption of Pers. بت‌کده butkada, from but "idol" + kada "dwelling."
Pahlavi
Etymology: Middle Persian Pahlavi. The Middle Persian language of Sassanid Persia. a script used for writing Pahlavi and other Middle Iranian languages.
Pajama
from Urdu/Hindi पैजामा paajaama, from Persian پایجامه - پا جامه pāë (pāÿ) jāmah, from pAy (="leg") + jAma (="garment"). of, pertaining to, or resembling pajamas: a pajama top; a lounging outfit with pajama pants
Pakistan
From پاکستان; the Persian word of "Land of the Pure"
Paneer
Hindi & Urdu पनीर/پنیر panir, from Persian پنیر panir (general term meaning Cheese). a soft uncured Indian cheese.
Papoosh
earlier papouch, from French, from Persian پاپوش pāpush.
Para
Etymology: Turkish, from Persian پاره pārah. a Turkish monetary unit equal in modern Turkey to 1/4000 of a lira. any one of several units of value formerly used in countries at one time under the Turkish Empire.
Paradise
via French: "paradis" and Latin: "paradisus," from Greek paradeisos (παράδεισος) (=enclosed park"), from the Avestan word pairidaeza (a walled enclosure), which is a compound of pairi- (around), a cognate of the Greek περί peri-, and -diz (to create, make), a cognate of the English dough. An associated word is the Sanskrit word paradesha which literally means supreme country.
Parasang
Latin parasanga, from Greek Παρασάγγης parasanges, of Iranian origin; akin to Persian farsung (فرسنگ) parasang
any of various Persian units of distance; especially: an ancient unit of about four miles (six kilometers)
Pargana
Etymology: Hindi परंगा pargana, from Persian. a group of towns in India constituting an administrative subdivision of the zillah.
Parsee
Etymology: from O.Pers. 𐎱𐎠𐎼𐎡 parsi "Persian." In M.E., Parsees from پارسی Pârsi. Meaning Persian. Also Zoroastrian of India descended from Persian refugees fleeing Islam in the 7th century and settling principally at Bombay
Pasar
Malay, from Persian بازار bāzār. See bazar. an Indonesian public market.
Pasha
Turkish paşa possibly from Persian پادشاه pādshāh; see Padishah.
Pashm
Etymology: pashm, pashim from Persian پشم pashm wool; pashmina from Persian pashmn woolen, from pashm. the under fleece of upland goats of Kashmir and the Punjab that was formerly used locally for the production of rugs and shawls but is now largely exported.
Pashmina
from Pashmineh, made from پشم pashm; pashm (= "wool"). the fine woolly underhair of goats raised in northern India.
Pashto: Persian pashtu
from Afghan. According to Morgenstein the word is akin to Parthava, Persian, Pahlav. The Iranian language of Pathan people and the chief vernacular of eastern Afghanistan, North-West Frontier Province of Pakistan, and northern Baluchistan
Path
Common Germanic. This word cannot be descended directly from Indo-European, as Indo-European words in p- become -f in Germanic. The most widely accepted theory sees this word as a borrowing from Iranian, in which Indo-European p- is preserved, and there is alternation between forms with -t- and forms with -θ-; compare Avestan pantā (nominative), paθō (genitive) way, Old Persian pathi-. This explanation does however pose historical problems, given the limited distribution of the Germanic word.
Peach
a corruption of the Latin word "Persicum." Peaches are called in Latin malum Persicum (Persian apple) prunum persicum (Persian plum), or simply persicum (pl. persici). This should not be confused with the more modern Linnaean classification Prunus persica, a neologism describing the peach tree itself (from the Latin prunus, -i which signifies "plum tree").
Percale
Persian پرگاله pargālah. a firm smooth cotton cloth closely woven in plain weave and variously finished for clothing, sheeting, and industrial uses.
Percaline
French, from percale (from Persian پرگاله pargālah) + -ine. a lightweight cotton fabric made in plain weave, given various finishes (as glazing, moiré), and used especially for clothing and linings; especially: a glossy fabric usually of one color used for bookbindings.
Peri
Etymology: Persian پری (pari) or fairy, genius, from Middle Persian parik. Persian folklore: a male or female supernatural being like an elf or fairy but formed of fire, descended from fallen angels and excluded from paradise until penance is accomplished, and originally regarded as evil but later as benevolent and beautiful. Also a beautiful and graceful girl or woman.
Persepolis
Etymology: from 𐎱𐎠𐎼𐎿 Pârsa+ Greek πόλεις polis.
Persia
Etymology: via Latin and Greek Περσίς, ultimately from Old Persian 𐎱𐎠𐎼𐎿 Pârsa
Persis
Etymology: via Latin and Greek Περσίς, ultimately from Old Persian 𐎱𐎠𐎼𐎿 Pârsa
Peshwa
Etymology: Hindi & Marathi पेशवा pesva, from Persian پیشوا peshwa leader, guide, from pesh before. the chief minister of a Maratha prince.
Pilaf
Etymology: 1925–30; < Turk pilâv < Pers پلو pilāw. a Middle Eastern dish consisting of sautéed, seasoned rice steamed in bouillon, sometimes with poultry, meat or shellfish.
Pir
Etymology: Persian پیر Pir (Old Man). a religious instructor, esp. in mystical sects.
Pistachio
Etymology: from Latin pistācium, from Greek πιστάκιον, from Persian پسته pistah. small tree (Pistacia vera) of southern Europe and Asia Minor having leaves with 3 to 5 broad leaflets, greenish brown paniculate flowers, and a large fruit. the edible green seed of the pistachio tree.
Posteen
Etymology: Persian pustin of leather, from pust skin, from Middle Persian. an Afghan pelisse made of leather with the fleece on.
Popinjay
Etymology: from O.Fr. papegai (12c.), from Sp. papagayo, from Ar. باباغا babagha', from Pers. ببقا babgha "parrot,"
Prophet flower
Etymology: translation of Persian گلی پیغمبر guli paighmbar flower of the Prophet (Muhammad). an East Indian perennial herb (Arnebia echioides) having yellow flowers marked with five spots that fade after a few hours; also: a related annual
Punjab
Etymology: via Hindi Panjab, from Pers. پنج panj "five" + آب ab "water.". of or relating to the Punjab or its inhabitants.
Purwannah
Etymology: Hindi परवाना parwana, from Persian: پرونه. a written pass or permit.
Pyke
Etymology: Hindi पायिक, पायक pāyik, pāyak messenger, from Persian dialect England: a civilian at whose expense a soldier is treated or entertained.
Pajamas
Etymology: Urdu/Hindi पैजामा pajama from Persian: پاجامہ (pajama, literally, leg-garments). These are loose lightweight trousers formerly often worn in the Near East, a loose usually two-piece lightweight suit designed especially for sleeping or lounging.

== R ==
Rank
Etymology: from Persian رنگ rang meaning "color", as the Sassanid army was ranked and dressed by color
roc
Etymology: from Persian رخ rukh (name of a legendary bird)
rook
Etymology: from Middle English rok, from Middle French roc, from Arabic روخ rukh, from Persian رخ rukh (=chess piece)
rose
Etymology: from Latin rosa, probably from ancient Greek ῥόδον rhodon, possibly ult. from Pers. وارده *varda-.
Roxanne
Etymology: fem. proper name, from Fr. Roxane, from L. Roxane, from Gk. Ρωξάνη Rhoxane, of Pers. origin (cf. Avestan راوُخشنه raoxšna- "shining, bright").

== S ==
Sabzi
Etymology: Hindi सब्ज़ sabz, literally, greenness, from Persian: سَبز sæbz, a green vegetable.
Saffian
Etymology: Russian сафьян saf'yan, from Turkish sahtiyan, from Persian ساختین sakhtiyn goatskin, from sakht hard, strong. a leather made of goatskins or sheepskins tanned with sumac and dyed with bright colors.
Saffron
Etymology: Anglo-French saffron, safren, from Medieval Latin safranum, from Arabic زعفران zaʽfarān, from Persian: زرپران zarparān gold strung.
Samosa
Etymology: Hindi समोसा samosa from Persian سمبوسه sambuseh. a small triangular pastry filled with spiced meat or vegetables and fried in ghee or oil. Also etymology: Hindi समोसा samos & Urdu سموسہ، سمبسا samosa, sambsa, from Persian سنبوسه sambuseh
Sandal
Etymology: Arabic صندل sandal, from Persian صندل sandal skiff.
Saoshyant
Etymology: Avestan, savior. one of three deliverers of later Zoroastrian eschatology appearing at thousand year intervals and each inaugurating a new order of things and a special period of human progress.
Sapindales
from Persian Spand (اسپند)
Sarangousty
Etymology: Persian سرانگشتی sar-angushti thin paste for painting the tips of fingers, from سر انگشت sar-e angosht, "fingertip", سر sar "head" + انگشت angosht "finger", "toe". stucco made waterproof for protection against dampness.
Sard from Persian زرد zard.
Sarod
Etymology: Hindi सरोद sarod, from Persian: سرود.
Sarwan
Etymology: Persian ساربان saarbaan. a camel driver.
Satrap
governor of a province of ancient Persia, from Latin satrapes, from Greek σατράπης satrapes, from Old Persian 𐎧𐏁𐏂𐎱𐎠𐎺𐎠 kshathrapavan-, lit. "guardian of the realm,"
Sebesten
Etymology: Middle English, Medieval Latin sebestēn, from Arabic سيبيستين sibistn, from Persian سگپیستان segpistan. an East Indian tree (Cordia myxa) with white flowers in loose terminal panicles.

=== Sebundy ===
Etymology: Hindi sibandī, from Persian. irregular native soldiery of the British in India

Scarlet
Etymology: from Pers. سقرلات saqerlât "a type of red cloth". a rich cloth of bright color. a vivid red that is yellower and slightly paler than apple red
Scimitar
Etymology: Middle French cimeterre, from Old Italian scimitarra, perhaps from Persian شمشیر shamshir. a type of blade.

=== Seer ===
Etymology: Hindi सेर ser; perhaps akin to Persian سیر seer. a unit of weight.
Seerpaw
Etymology: Hindi سر Sar(head)+پا paa(feet), from Persian. a robe presented by a person of rank and worn as a mark of distinction in India.
Seersucker
Etymology: Persian شیر و سکر shir o shakkar "striped cloth," lit. "milk and sugar". Also from Sanskrit क्षीरशर्करा (kshirsharkara), or milk-sugar."
Sepoy
Etymology: modification of Portuguese sipai, sipaio, from Hindi सिपाह sipah, from Persian سپاهی Sipahi, horseman, soldier of the cavalry, from sipah army. a native of India employed as a soldier in the service of a European power; especially: one serving in the British army.
Serai
Etymology: from Persian سرای saraay, palace, mansion, inn.
Seraglio
from سرای sarây "inn"
Serang
Etymology: Persian سرهنگ sarhang commander, boatswain, from سر sar chief + هنگ hang authority. boatswain. the skipper of a small boat.
Serdab
Persian سرداب sardab ice cellar, from سرد sard cold + آب ab water. a living room in the basement of a house in the Near East that provides coolness during the summer months
Serendipity
from the Persian fairy tale The Three Princes of Serendip سه شاهزاده‌ى سراندیپ, from Persian Sarandip سراندیپ(="Sri Lanka"),
Sesban
Etymology: French, from Arabic سيسبان saisabaan, from Persian سیسبان sisabaan. Either of two East Indian plants of the genus Sesbania (S. aculeata and S. aegyptiaca).
Setwall
Etymology: from Persian زادور zaadwar.
Shabundar/Shabandar
Etymology: From Persian شهباندار shahbandar, from شاه shah king + بندر bandar city, harbor.
Shah
Etymology: from شاه shāh, from Old Persian 𐏋 χšāyaþiya (="king"), from an Old Persian verb meaning "to rule"
Shahi
Etymology: Persian شاهی shahi. a former Persian unit of value equal to 1/20 silver kran; also: a corresponding coin of silver or copper or nickel
Shahidi
Etymology: Arabic شهيد Shahid (one who bears witness) + Persian suffix ی i.
Shahin
Etymology: Persian شاهین shahin (falcon). An Indian falcon (Falco peregrinus peregrinator) having the underparts of a plain unbarred ferruginous color, being related to the peregrine falcon, and used in falconry
Shahzada
Etymology: Hindi शाह-जादा shah-zada, from Persian, from شاه shah king + زاده zada son. The son of a Shah.
Shamiana
Etymology: Hindi शामियाना shamiyana, from Persian شامیانه shamyanah. a cloth canopy
Shawl
Etymology: from Persian شال shāl.
Sherristar
Etymology: from Hindi सर्रिश्ताद्र sarrishtadr, from Persian سررشته sarrishta(sarreshteh) record office + دار daar having. Registrar.
Sherry
According to one theory, it is from Jerez in Spain, which itself comes from Pers شیراز Shiraz during the time of Rustamid empire in Spain. The theory is also mentioned by Professor. T.B. Irving in one of his book reviews
Sherryvallies
Etymology: modification of Polish szarawary, from Russian шаравары sharavary, from Greek σαρβαρα sarabara loose trousers, probably of Iranian origin; akin to Persian شلوار shalwar, shulwar loose trousers. overalls or protective leggings of thick cloth or leather formerly worn for riding on horseback
Shikar
Etymology: Hindi सीकर sikar, from Persian شکار shikaar, Middle Persian شکار shkaar. The word means hunting.
Shikargah
Etymology: Hindi सिकारगाह sikaargaah, from Persian شکارگاه shikrgaah, from shikaar hunting + -gah place. A game preserve.
Shikari
Etymology: From Persian شکار Shikar+Persian suffix ی (i) denoting possession. a big game hunter.
Shikasta
Etymology: Persian شکسته shikasta broken, from shikastan شكستن to break, from Middle Persian shikastan.
Shikra
Etymology: from Persian شکرا shikara bird trained to hunt. a small Indian hawk (Accipiter badius) sometimes used in falconry.
Simurgh
Etymology: from Pers. سیمرغ simurgh, from Pahlavi sin "eagle" + murgh "bird." Cf. Avestan saeno merego "eagle," Skt. syenah "eagle," Arm. ցին cin "kite.". a supernatural bird, rational and ancient, in Pers. mythology.
Sipahis
See Spahi and Sepoy.
Sircar
Etymology: Hindi सरकार sarkaar, from Persian سرکار sarkaar. a district or province in India under the Mogul empire. the supreme authority. used also as a title of respect. in Bengal a domestic servant having the functions of a steward.
Sitar
Etymology: via Hindi सितार sitar, from Pers. ستار sitar "three-stringed," from sih/she "three" (O.Pers. thri-) + Persian. tar "string". an Indo-Iranian lute with a long broad neck and a varying number of strings whose various forms are used in Iran, Afghanistana and the Indian subcontinent.
Softa
Etymology: Turkish, from Persian سوخته sukhtah burnt, kindled (with love of knowledge).
Sogdian
Etymology: Latin sogdianus, from Old Persian Sughuda. of, relating to, or characteristic of ancient Sogdiana.
Soorkee
: Etymology: Hindi सुर्ख surkh, from Persian سرخ surkh, literally, redness, from surkh red, from Middle Persian سخر sukhr; akin to Avestan suXra- bright, Sanskrit sukra. a brick that is pulverized and mixed with lime to form a mortar
Sowar
Etymology: Persian سوار suwar rider, from Middle Persian asbar, aspwar, from Old Persian asabra- horseman, from asa- horse + -bra- carried by, rider. a mounted orderly. Lancer.
Spahi
Etymology: Middle French spahi, from Turkish sipahi, from Persian سپاه from Pahlavi spāh, from Old Persian taxma spāda, from Avestan spādha, meaning army, military. one of a corps of Algerian native cavalry in the French army normally serving in Africa. one of a corps of largely irregular Turkish cavalry disbanded after the suppression of the Janissaries in 1826.
Spinach
Etymology: Middle French espinache, espinage, from Old Spanish espinaca, from Arabic يسبناخ, يسفينآخ isbnakh, isfinaakh, from Persian اسپاخ aspanakh.
Squinch
Etymology: Persian سه+کنج=) سکنج) (pronounced sekonj)—A squinch in architecture is a construction filling in the upper angles of a square room so as to form a base to receive an octagonal or spherical dome. A later solution of this structural problem was provided by the pendentive. The squinch was invented in Iran. It was used in the Middle East in both eastern Romanesque and Islamic architecture. It remained a feature of Islamic architecture, especially in Iran, and was often covered by corbelled stalactite-like structures known as muqarnas.
-Stan
Etymology: ـستان; meaning "land" or "country", source of place names such as Afghanistan, Pakistan, Uzbekistan, etc., from Pers. -stan "country," from Sanskrit स्थानम् (sthanam) "place," lit. "where one stands,"
Subahdar
Etymology: Persian سبادار subadar, from suba province + -dar having, holding, from Old Persian dar- to hold. the chief native officer of a native company in the former British Indian army having a position about equivalent to that of captain
Sugar
Etymology: The word is Sanskrit which is an Indo-Iranian language of the Indo-Aryan branch but Persian played a role in transmitting it. Middle English sugre, sucre, from Anglo-French sucre, from Medieval Latin saccharum, from Old Italian zucchero, from Arabic sukkar, from Pahlavi shakar, ultimately from Sanskrit sarkara
Suclat
Etymology: Hindi सुकला suqlaa, from Persian سقلات saqalaat a rich cloth. In India any of various woolens; specifically European broadcloth.
Surma
Etymology: Persian سرما Surma. native antimony sulfide used in India to darken the eyelids.
Surnay
Etymology: Persian سرنای Surnaay. a Middle Eastern and Central Asian oboe.
syagush
Etymology: Persian سیاه-گوش siyah-gush, literally, black ear. Caracal.:

== T ==
Tabasheer
Etymology: Hindi तब्श्र tabshr, from Persian. a siliceous concretion in the joints of the bamboo valued in the East Indies as a medicine.
Tabor
Etymology: Middle English tabur, from Welsh Tabwrdd and Old French tabour/tabur, alteration of tambur. See tambour.
Taffeta
Etymology: from Persian تافته taftah meaning woven.
Tahsildar
Etymology: Hindi तहसीलदार tahsildar, from Persian تحصیلدار, from Arabic تحصيل tahsil + Persian در -dar. a revenue officer in India.
Taj
Etymology: Arabic تاج taj, from Persian تاج taj, crown, crest, cap. a cap worn in Muslim countries; especially: a tall cone-shaped cap worn by dervishes.
Taj Mahal
Etymology: from Persian: تاج محل, lit. "the best of buildings;" or "the Crown's Place".
Tajikistan
Etymology: تاجیکستان; Tajik combined with Persian suffix -stan. Literally meaning "Land of Tajiks" in Persian.
Talc
Etymology: from Pers. تالک talk "talc."
Tambour
Etymology: French, drum, from Middle French, from Arabic طنبور tanbur, modification (influenced by tunbur, a lute) of Persian تعبیر tabir.
Tambourine
See above.
Tanbur
Etymology: Persian تمبر Tambur.
Tangi
Etymology: Persian تنگی Tangi. a narrow gorge
Tandoori
Etymology: from تنور tannur "oven, portable furnace,"+Persian suffix i.
Tapestry
Etymology: probably from an Iranian source (cf. Pers. تفتان، تابیدن taftan, tabidan "to turn, twist").
Tar
Etymology: Persian: تار. An oriental lute.
Tarazet
Etymology: from (Shahin-e Tarazu) شاهین ترازو
Tass
Etymology: Middle French tasse, from Arabic طعس/تصح tass, tassah, from Persian تست tast. a drinking cup or bowl.
Tebbad
Etymology: perhaps from Persian تاب tab fever + باد bad wind, from Middle Persian vat; akin to Avestan vata- wind, Sanskrit वत vata.
Tel Aviv
Etymology: From Persian words تل and ابیب as in Book of Ezekiel 15:3, which in Farsi mean mound and flood respectively
Temacha
Etymology: Persian تاماخرا tamakhra joke, humor. a Persian comic or farcical interlude performed by traveling players.
Thanadar
Etymology: Hindi थंडर thandar, from تهان than + Persian در -dar having. the chief officer of a thana.
Tiara
Etymology: via Latin tiara from Persian تاره tara
Timar
Etymology: Turkish timar attendance, care, timar, from Persian تمر tmr sorrow, care. a Turkish fief formerly held under condition of military service.
Tiger
Etymology: via Greek Τίγρις tigris from an Iranian source
Tigris
Etymology: From Middle Persian تیگر Tigr "arrow", originally from Old Persian 𒋾𒂵𒊏 Tigra "pointed" or "sharp"
Toque
Etymology: from O. Pers. طاق taq "veil, shawl."
Toxic
Etymology: from O. Pers. taxša- "bow and arrow, New Persian تخش taxš" from PIE *tekw- "to run, flee." (poison) for use on arrows
Tranky
Etymology: Persian dialect ترانکی tranki. an undecked bark used in the Persian gulf.
Trehala
Etymology: probably from French tréhala, from Turkish tgala, from Persian تیغال tighal.
Tulip
Etymology: any of various plants belonging to the genus Tulipa. from French tulipe, from Persian دلبند dulband.
Turan
from Persian توران
Turanian
Etymology: Persian توران Turan, the region north of the Oxus + English -ian.
Turanite
Etymology: from Persian توران Turan + Russian -it' -ite. a basic vanadate of copper prob. Cu_{5}(VO_{4})_{2}(OH)_{4}.
Turanose
Etymology: German turanos, from Persian توران Turan + German -os -ose; obtained by the partial hydrolysis of melezitose; 3-α-glucosyl-fructose
Turban
Etymology: from Persian دلبند dulband Band = To close, To tie.
Turkmenistan
Etymology: ترکمنستان; Turkmen combined with Persian suffix ـستان -stan. Literally meaning "Land of Turkmens" in Persian.
Typhoon
Etymology: via Chinese 大风/大風, Hindi दफुं, Arabic طوفان, and Ancient Greek τυφῶν; ultimately from Persian word Toofaan (طوفان)

== U ==
Uzbekistan
Etymology: ازبکستان; Uzbek combined with Persian suffix ـستان -stan. Literally meaning "Land of Uzbeks" in Persian.

== V ==
Van
Etymology: from Caravan (q.v.)
Vispered
Etymology: Avestan vispa ratavo meaning all the lords. one of the supplementary ritual texts included in the Avestan sacred writings.
vizier
Arthur Jefferey and Jared S. Klein Derive it from Middle Persian وهر vichir, from Avestan vicira, "arbitrator, judge." others derive it from Arabic وزير wazir, "viceroy", lit. "one who bears (the burden of office)", lit. "porter, carrier", from Arabic وزارة wazara, "he carried".

== X ==
Xerxes
Etymology: Gk. form (Ξέρξης) of O. Pers. 𐎧𐏁𐎹𐎠𐎼𐏁𐎠𐎠 Kshayarshan-, lit. "male (i.e. 'hero') among kings," from Kshaya- "king" (cf. shah) + arshan "male, man."

== Y ==
Yarak
Etymology: From Persian یارِگی yaraki power, strength. good flying condition: FETTLE – used of a hawk or other bird used in hunting eagles ... are difficult to get into yarak – Douglas Carruthers.
Yasht
Etymology: Modern Persian یشت from Avesta. Avestan yashtay adoration. one of the hymns to angels or lesser divinities forming part of the Avesta.
Yuft
Etymology: Russian Йуфт, Йухт yuft', yukht', perhaps from Persian جفت juft pair.

== Z ==
Zamindar
Etymology: zamindar, from Persian, from زمین zamin land + دار -dar holder meaning "Possessor of real estate" in Persian. A collector of revenues from the cultivators of the land of a specified district for the government of India during the period of Muslim rule
Zamindari
Etymology: from Persian, from زمیندار zamindar.
Zanza
Etymology: Arabic سنج sanj castanets, cymbals, from Persian سنج sanj. an African musical instrument consisting of graduated sets of tongues of wood or metal inserted into and resonated by a wooden box and sounded by plucking with the fingers or thumbs.
Zanzibar
Etymology: in Farsi: Zang-bar meaning black-coast
Zarathushtra or Zarathustra
the Persian prophet
Zedoary
Etymology: Middle English zeduarie, from Medieval Latin zeduria, from Arabic زادور zadwr, from Persian. an East Indian drug consisting of the rhizome of either of two species of curcuma, Curcuma zedoaria or C. aromatica, used as a stimulant.
Zenana
Etymology: From Persian زن zan woman. The literal meaning is Women-related. The part of a dwelling in which the women of a family are secluded in India and Persian.
Zena
feminine given name from Persian زن Zan (woman).
Zerda
Etymology: Arabic زيرداو zerdaw, probably of Persian origin. Fennec.
Zircon
Via German Zirkon and Arabic ئشقنعى zarkûn; ultimately from Persian زرگون zargun, "gold-colored" or from Syriac ܙܐܪܓܥܢܥ Zargono.
Zirconate
Etymology: zircon + the suffix -ate, from Latin -atus
Zirconia
Etymology: zircon + the New Latin -ia suffix
Zirconium
Etymology: zircon + the New Latin suffix -ium
Zoroaster
Etymology: from Persian Zarathushtra
Zoroastrianism
The religion brought forth by Zoroaster.
Zumbooruk
Etymology: rom Persian زنبوره zanburah.

== Sources ==
- Persian in English: Interaction of languages and cultures. by Mirfazaelian A., published by Farhang Moaser, Tehran, Iran 2006. (in Persian)
