= Gatch =

Gatch is a surname. Notable people with the surname include:

- Gil Gatch (born 1981), American politician and attorney
- Helen Gatch (1862–1942), American painter and photographer, mother of Thomas Leigh Gatch
- Lee Gatch (1902–1968), American artist
- Philip Gatch (1751–1835), American Methodist minister
- Thomas Benton Gatch (1841–1933), Confederate Army officer in the American Civil War and post-war politician and businessman
- Thomas Milton Gatch (1833–1913), president of Willamette University, Oregon State University, and the University of Washington
- Thomas Leigh Gatch (1891–1954), American vice admiral, Judge Advocate General of the Navy and attorney, grandson of Thomas Milton Gatch
- Thomas Leigh Gatch, Jr. (1926–1974?), lost while attempting the first crossing of the Atlantic Ocean by balloon, son of Thomas Leigh Gatch

== See also ==
- Gatch bed, a type of hospital bed invented by Dr Willis Dew Gatch (1877-1962)
- Gatch Site, an archaeological site located near Milford, Ohio, United States
