= Thomas Gatch =

Thomas Gatch may refer to:-

- Thomas Benton Gatch (1841–1933), Confederate Army officer in the American Civil War and post-war politician and businessman
- Thomas M. Gatch (1833–1913), president of Willamette University, Oregon Agricultural College (Oregon State University), and the University of Washington
- Thomas Leigh Gatch (1891–1954), American vice admiral, judge advocate general of the Navy and attorney, grandson of Thomas M. Gatch
- Thomas Leigh Gatch, Jr. (1925–1974), son of the vice admiral, disappeared while attempting to make the first Transatlantic crossing by a balloon
