= Badmaash =

Badmaash may refer to:

- Budmash, term for a miscreant
- Badmash.org, Indian-American web comic
- Badmaash (1998 film), an Indian Hindi-language film
- Badmaash (2016 film), an Indian Kannada-language romantic thriller film

== See also ==
- Badmash Darpan, a Bhojpuri-language book by Indian writer Teg Ali Teg
- Maha Badmaash, 1977 Indian Hindi-language film
- Badmaash Company, 2010 Indian Hindi-language film by Parmeet Sethi
- Badmashiyaan, a 2015 Indian Hindi-language film by Amit Khanna
- Badmash Gallaki Bumper Offer, a 2023 Indian Telugu-language film
- Badmashulu, a 2025 Indian Telugu-language film
