= Pasar (TV series) =

2009 Malaysian television series

- Starring: Lee Meng Chong; William San; Eunice Ng; Mayjune Tan; Kyo Chen; Aric Ho; Angie
- Music by: 单
- Country of origin: Malaysia
- Original language: Mandarin
- No. of episodes: 20

Production
- Running time: approx. 45 minutes

Original release
- Network: ntv7
- Release: 2009 – 2009

Pasar tells the story about three friends who worked at the pasar malam together. Pasar is co-produced by ntv7 from Malaysia and mm2 Entertainment.
