= Lahori chaddar =

Type of shawl

Lahori chaddar (meaning "soft wool wrapper") were plain shawls made with soft goat hair fibre (Kabuli Pashm, Pashm (پشم) meaning "wool") that were produced in Punjab in the early 19th century. The name itself suggests the chaddar (sheets) made in Lahore.

== See also ==
- List of English words of Persian origin
