= AS Douanes =

AS Douanes, a shorted version of Association Sportive Douanes, may refer to:

- AS Douanes (Togo), a football club in Lomé
- AS Douanes (Senegal), a football club in Dakar
- AS Douanes (basketball), a basketball club in Dakar
- AS Douanes (Mauritania)
- AS Douanes (Niger), a football club in Niamey
- AS Douanes (Burkina Faso), a football club in Ouagadougou

== See also ==
- Douanes (disambiguation)
- Racing de Casablanca, Morocco, named Association des Douanes Marocains from 1969 to the 1980s
