= Binswanger =

Binswanger is a surname. Notable people with the surname include:

- Harry Binswanger (born 1944), American philosopher
- Ludwig Binswanger (1881–1966), Swiss psychologist, nephew of Otto Binswanger, important in existential psychology
- Otto Ludwig Binswanger (1852–1929), Swiss neurologist and psychiatrist, uncle of Ludwig Binswanger
- Otto Saly Binswanger (1854–1917), German-American chemist and toxicologist, cousin of Otto Ludwig Binswanger

== See also ==
- Binswanger's disease (subcortical leukoencephalopathy), in neurology, a form of multi-infarct dementia first described in 1894 by Otto Binswanger
