= Emma Plummer Chadwick =

American clubwoman (1863–1962)

- Born: Emma Plummer; November 5, 1863; Windsor, California, U.S.
- Died: November 11, 1962 (aged 99); Seattle, Washington, U.S.
- Resting place: Lake View Cemetery
- Education: Willamette University; Illinois State Normal School
- Occupations: clubwoman schoolteacher
- Spouse: Stephen J. Chadwick
- Children: 4
- Parent(s): Orlando Plummer (father); Sarah B. Cool (mother)
- Relatives: Helen Plummer Gatch (sister)

Emma Plummer Chadwick (November 5, 1863 – November 11, 1962) was an American clubwoman, educator, and civic leader. She served as the Most Grand Worthy Matron of the Order of the Eastern Star. Chadwick also chaired the Daughters of the American Revolution committee responsible for designing the Flag of Washington.

== Early life, family, and education ==
Chadwick was born Emma Plummer on November 5, 1863, in Windsor, California. She was the daughter of Orlando Plummer, a physician and politician who served in the Oregon House of Representatives, and Sarah B. Cool. Her parents later divorced.

She studied at Willamette University and Illinois State Normal School.

== Career and civic activities ==
Prior to her marriage, Chadwick worked as a schoolteacher in Portland and in Pacific County.

Upon the insistence of DAR State Regent Angie Elizabeth Burt Bowden, Chadwick chaired a design committee formed by the Daughters of the American Revolution to design a new flag of Washington in 1915. Prior to its official recognition by the Washington state government, the DAR flew the flag from 1915 to 1916 at Memorial Continental Hall in Washington, D.C.

In 1927, Chadwick succeeded Clara Henrick as the Most Grand Worthy Matron of the Order of the Eastern Star. She had previously served as the order's deputy grand matron.

== Personal life and death ==
In 1887, she married the lawyer Stephen J. Chadwick, who later served as a justice of the Washington Supreme Court. They had four children. Their son, Stephen Fowler Chadwick, ran for the United States House of Representatives in 1926 and the United States Senate in 1932 and 1940.

She died on November 11, 1962. The Emma P. Chadwick Home, a nursing home run by the Order of the Eastern Star, was named after her.
