= USS Dashiell =

Fletcher-class destroyer

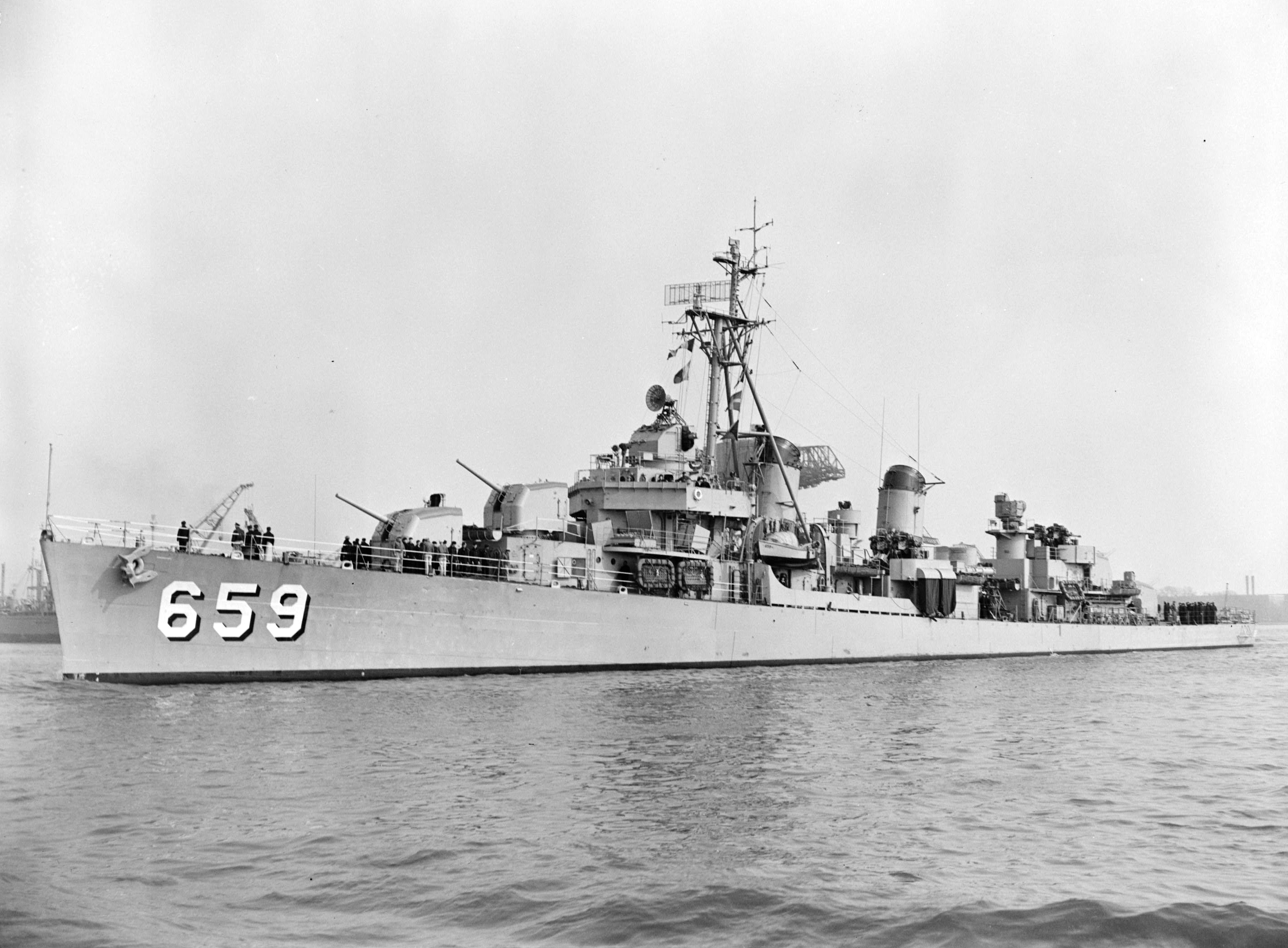
- Dashiell in 1952

History

United States
- Name: USS Dashiell
- Namesake: Robert B. Dashiell
- Builder: Federal Shipbuilding and Drydock Company, Kearny, New Jersey
- Laid down: 1 October 1942
- Launched: 6 February 1943
- Commissioned: 20 March 1943
- Decommissioned: 29 April 1960
- Stricken: 1 December 1974
- Fate: Sold for scrap, 21 September 1975

General characteristics
- Class & type: Fletcher-class destroyer
- Displacement: 2,050 tons
- Length: 376 ft 6 in (114.76 m)
- Beam: 39 ft 7 in (12.07 m)
- Draft: 17 ft 9 in (5.41 m)
- Propulsion: 60,000 shp (45,000 kW); 2 propellers
- Speed: 35 knots (65 km/h; 40 mph)
- Range: 6,500 nautical miles (12,000 km; 7,500 mi) at 15 knots (28 km/h; 17 mph)
- Complement: 319
- Armament: 5 × 5 in (127 mm) /38 guns, 4 × 40 mm AA guns, 4 × 20 mm AA guns; 10 × 21 in (530 mm) torpedo tubes; 6 × depth charge projectors, 2 × depth charge tracks

USS Dashiell (DD-659) was a Fletcher-class destroyer of the United States Navy, named for Robert B. Dashiell (1860–1899).

Dashiell was launched 6 February 1943 by Federal Shipbuilding and Dry Dock Co., Kearny, N.J. sponsored by Mrs. R. B. Dashiell, widow of Assistant Naval Constructor Dashiell; and commissioned 20 March 1943.

== Service history ==
=== World War II ===
Dashiell arrived at Pearl Harbor 24 July 1943 to join the Fast Carrier Task Forces for the raids on Marcus Island of 31 August to 1 September; Tarawa, 18–20 September; and Wake Island, 5–6 October. Arriving at Efate, New Hebrides, 5 November, she prepared for the invasion of the Gilberts and was one of the first to enter the lagoon in the assault on Tarawa 20 November. She passed into the lagoon under heavy enemy fire, took up position just off Tarawa's reef, and opened return fire on shore batteries, enemy strongpoints and an ammunition dump to aid the troops ashore for three days. Following the cessation of hostilities on Tarawa, she was sent to the US west coast for an overhaul.

After training exercises in the Hawaiian Islands, Dashiell arrived at Guadalcanal 16 March 1944. She cleared the next day to bombard Kavieng, New Ireland, on 20 March. Dashiell provided fire support, patrol, and convoy escort services from 6 April to 13 May as landings were made on the coast of New Guinea. She returned to Port Purvis on Florida Island in the Solomons 17 May to prepare for the invasion of the Marianas. She sailed 4 June to guard transports held in reserve during the assaults on Saipan and on Tinian, then screened the landings at Guam during which she provided fire support from 20 to 26 July.

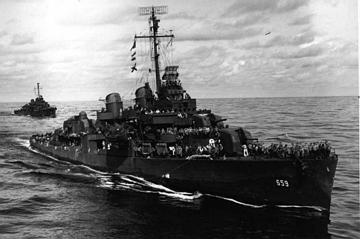
Dashiell in November 1943.

Her next action took her to Morotai, the stepping stone to the Philippines. Dashiell patrolled and screened transports during the landings there on 18 and 19 September and the reinforcement landings of 1 October. She joined the Northern Attack Force for the initial landings on Leyte at San Pedro Bay, on 20 October and cleared at once for New Guinea to bring transports north for reinforcement landings from 12 to 16 November. She again convoyed troops and supplies from New Guinea bases to Leyte between 24 November and 9 December. Three days later she sortied from Leyte Gulf screening an amphibious group bound for the assault landings at Mindoro. The second day out a kamikaze crashed the flagship, and the flag was transferred to Dashiell for the landings on 15 December. Returning to Leyte, she joined in repelling a Japanese air attack on 20 December. Six of her men were wounded in this action.

Arriving in Lingayen Gulf, Luzon, 9 January 1945 for the initial landings on Luzon, Dashiell remained there on patrol and fire support duty until 10 February. She downed at least three suicide planes, sank several Japanese small craft, and destroyed key positions ashore. She arrived at Ulithi 28 February to join the fast carrier task groups of the 5th Fleet for the raids on Japan and Okinawa during March in preparation for the Okinawa invasion. Dashiell screened the assault on 1 April, and remained off the island on radar picket duty. Her toughest battle against the kamikaze flights came on 14 April, when 20 planes attacked her station. She shot down four and outmaneuvered the rest, but was damaged by the near miss of a bomb and put into Ulithi 23 April for repairs. Returning to Okinawa 17 May, she joined the 3d Fleet for continued air attacks on Japan into August. At the end of the war she entered Tokyo Bay and remained there until 6 September, when she sailed for Pearl Harbor and Charleston, South Carolina, arriving 21 October. Dashiell was placed out of commission in reserve there 30 March 1946.

=== 1951 – 1960 ===
Recommissioned 3 May 1951 Dashiell operated out of Newport along the Atlantic coast and in the Caribbean until 26 August 1952 when she sailed to Northern Europe for the North Atlantic Treaty Organization (NATO) fall exercises, visiting Greenock, Scotland, and Rotterdam, the Netherlands, before returning to Newport 11 October. On 27 April 1953 she got underway for a round-the-world cruise, arriving at Yokosuka 2 June for operations off Korea and patrol duty in the Taiwan Straits until 9 October. She continued west to call at Saigon, Singapore, Colombo, Port Said, Cannes, Nice, and Lisbon before reaching Philadelphia 4 December. Between 1954 and 1959 Dashiell alternated four tours of duty with the 6th Fleet in the Mediterranean with local operations out of Newport and exercises in the Caribbean. She was decommissioned and placed in reserve 29 April 1960.

Dashiell was stricken from the Naval Vessel Register 1 December 1974. She was sold 21 September 1975, and broken up for scrap.

== Awards ==
Dashiell was awarded 10 battle stars for World War II service.
