= Julian Hatcher =

United States Army general (1888–1963)

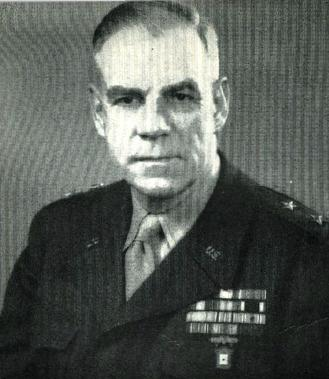
- Born: Julian Sommerville Hatcher; June 26, 1888; Hayfield, Virginia, U.S.
- Died: December 4, 1963 (aged 75); Falls Church, Virginia, U.S.
- Burial place: Arlington National Cemetery
- Military career
- Allegiance: United States of America
- Branch: United States Army
- Service years: 1909–1946
- Rank: Major General
- Service number: 0-2908
- Commands: Chief of Ordnance Field Service
- Known for: Hatcher's Notebook; Book of the Garand
- Conflicts: World War I, World War II
- Awards: Distinguished Service Medal; Legion of Merit

Julian Sommerville Hatcher (June 26, 1888 – December 4, 1963) was a major general in the United States Army. As a firearms expert, he wrote technical books and articles relating to military firearms, ballistics, and autoloading weapons. He also pioneered the forensic identification of firearms and ammunition.

== Biography ==
Hatcher was born in Hayfield, Virginia, and graduated with honors from the United States Naval Academy in 1909. He transferred out of the Navy, due to chronic sea sickness, and was assigned to the Army Coast Artillery Corps. Hatcher married Eleanor Dashiell, daughter of naval ordnance expert Robert B. Dashiell, in October 1910. The couple had three children.

In 1916, the Hotchkiss M1909 Benét–Mercié machine gun was in general use with the U.S. Army and was seeing action during the Punitive Expedition against the bandit Pancho Villa. Reports of its use in Mexico indicated the gun was not functioning properly. Investigation revealed that the chief problems were the 30-round metallic feed strips used in the gun, and inexperienced gunners. It was Hatcher, then a lieutenant, who was sent to the border to solve the problems. He found that none of the soldiers had been taught the proper use of the weapon. He set up the Army's first machine gun school and was soon turning out trained crews. Soon, the Benét–Mercié proved to be an effective weapon.

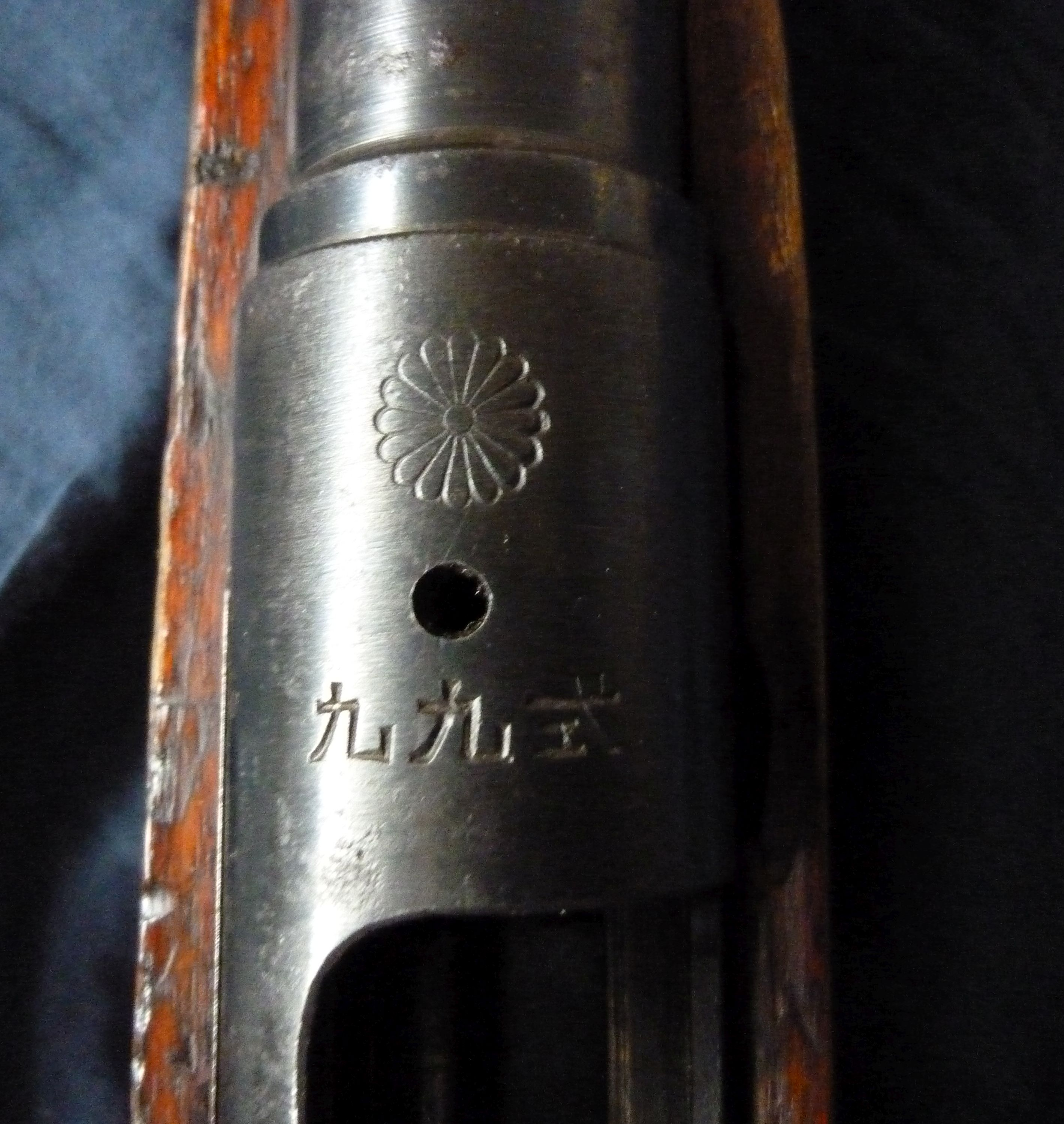
An example of a Hatcher hole, used to prevent grenading of receivers (Japanese Type 99 rifle shown).

In 1919, at age 31 and holding the acting rank of lieutenant colonel, Hatcher was named commanding officer of Springfield Armory in Massachusetts. He was instrumental in developing a solution to the vexing problem of brittle metal in early receivers of M1903 Springfield rifles, built by Springfield Armory and Rock Island Arsenal. His fail-safe solution to the "grenading" of receivers (damage caused when shell casings failed catastrophically) was to drill a gas vent hole in the left side of the receiver, adjacent to the breech. The hole allowed gases escaping from a ruptured case to be exhausted safely and away from the face of the shooter. Dubbed the "Hatcher Hole", the modification was typically added to receivers at overhaul.

As Chief of the Small Arms Division in the United States Army Ordnance Department and the Assistant Commandant of the Ordnance School before and at the beginning of World War II, Hatcher worked closely with Springfield Armory as an engineering trouble-shooter in resolving early production issues associated with the early iterations of the M1 Garand rifle.

Hatcher's premier works are Hatcher's Notebook and Book of the Garand, both published shortly after World War II. Prior to the war, he wrote Pistols and Revolvers and Their Use and Textbook of Pistols and Revolvers. In the latter work, he introduced the Hatcher Scale, probably the first attempt to determine the stopping power of a handgun round by a formula.

After retiring from the military in 1946, Hatcher served as technical editor of American Rifleman magazine. He died at his home in Falls Church, Virginia, on December 4, 1963.

== Books ==
Hatcher author or co-authored the following books:

- Hatcher, Julian S.; Wilhelm, Glenn P.; Malony, Harry J. (1917). Machine Guns. Menasha, Wisconsin: George Banta Pub. Co. [Riling 1833]
- Hatcher, Julian S. (1927). Pistols and Revolvers and Their Use. Marshallton, Delaware: Small-Arms Technical Pub. Co. [Riling 2017]
- Hatcher, Julian S. (1935). Textbook of Pistols and Revolvers. Onslow County, North Carolina: Small-Arms Technical Pub. Co. [Riling 2170]
- Hatcher, Julian S. (1935). Textbook of Firearms Investigation. Plantersville, South Carolina: Small-Arms Technical Pub. Co. [Riling 2171]
- Hatcher, Julian S. (1947). Hatcher's Notebook. Harrisburg, Pennsylvania: Military Service Pub. Co. [Riling 2596]
- Hatcher, Julian S. (1947). The Book of the Garand. Washington: Infantry Journal Press. [Riling 2645]
- Hatcher, Julian S.; Barr, Al; White, H. P.; Neumann, Charles L. (1950). Handloading. Washington: National Rifle Association of America. [Riling 2722]
