= Orlando Plummer =

American politician (1836–1913)

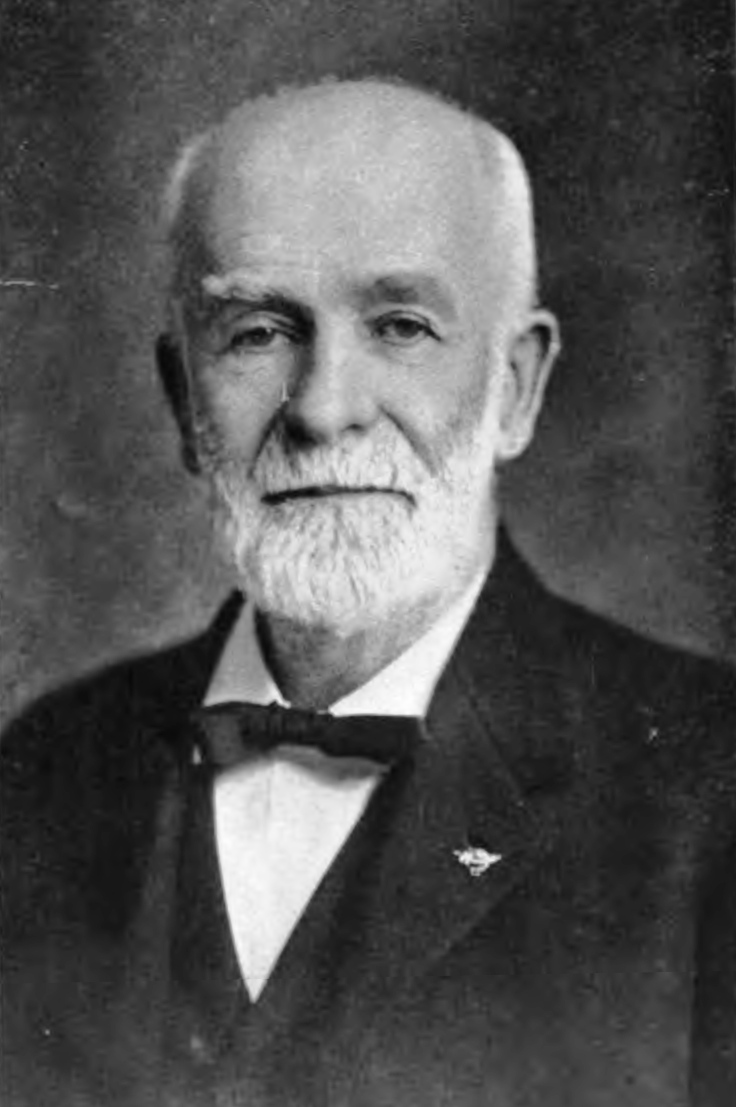
- Plummer circa 1910

Member of the Oregon House of Representatives
- In office 1880–1885
- Constituency: Multnomah County

Member of the Portland City Council
- In office 1865–1866
- Constituency: Portland, Oregon

Personal details
- Born: April 13, 1836 Greenville, Pennsylvania
- Died: December 7, 1913 (aged 77) Portland, Oregon
- Party: Republican
- Spouse(s): Sarah B. Cool (1859); Martha Elizabeth Kelly (1874)
- Children: Emma Plummer Chadwick; Helen Plummer Gatch
- Education: Jefferson Medical College

Orlando Pleasant Shields Plummer (April 13, 1836 – December 7, 1913) was an American physician and politician in the state of Oregon. A native of Pennsylvania, he started practicing medicine in Illinois before moving to Portland, Oregon. In Oregon, he continued his medical work as well as working for several telegraph companies. A Republican, Plummer was also a member of the Oregon Legislative Assembly, a medical professor, fruit farmer, and Portland city council member. His drug store in downtown had the first telephone in Portland.

== Early life ==
Orlando Pleasant Shields Plummer (often O.P.S. Plummer) was born in Greenville, Mercer County, Pennsylvania, on April 13, 1836, to Elizabeth (née Craig) and John Boyd Plummer. His grandfather on his mother’s side was a veteran of the American Revolutionary War. Plummer received his early education at the local public schools and at the Greenville Academy. He then was employed as an assistant at the local telegraph office, which led to additional jobs working for the telegraph company in Chicago, Pittsburgh, and Cleveland. Plummer continued in this line of work at an office in Rock Island, Illinois, where his brother S. C. Plummer was a doctor.

Orlando read medicine from his brother before he returned to his native Pennsylvania to enter medical school. He attended school at Jefferson Medical College in Philadelphia where he graduated in 1857 with a Doctor of Medicine. Plummer returned to Illinois and practiced medicine in the communities of Aledo and Moline from 1858 to 1863. In 1859, he married Sarah B. Cool with whom he had three daughters, including Emma Plummer Chadwick, with the marriage ending in divorce. One daughter married Claude Gatch, one-time mayor of Salem, Oregon. In 1863, Plummer took the Oregon Trail to California to continue working for the telegraph company, traveling by mule team. He spent the winter of 1863 to 1864 working in a telegraph office there before receiving a promotion.

== Oregon ==
Plummer was promoted to manager of the Portland, Oregon, office of the California State Telegraph Company. He arrived on April 9, 1864, and became the first interstate telegraph operator in the city. In the fall of 1866 he resigned from the company and moved south to Albany to resume practicing medicine. After two years Plummer returned to working in the telegraph industry, now for Western Union, who had purchased Plummer’s former employer. He was hired as the superintendent for their Oregon district, and served in that position from 1868 to 1875.

During his time as superintendent, he began teaching at the Willamette University College of Medicine in Salem. Plummer taught hygiene and medical electricity for three years at the school. In 1874, he married Martha Elizabeth Kelly, daughter of Rev. Albert Kelly Rev. Albert Kelly and niece of Clinton Kelly and aunt of Penumbra Kelly. Martha was fourteen years younger than Orlando, and they had five children; Grace, Agnes, Ross, Hildegarde, and Marion. Land that constitutes Albert Kelly Park in Portland was gifted by Hildegarde in 1956.

In 1877, Plummer returned to Portland to practice medicine and opened a drug store at First and Salmon streets in what is today Downtown Portland. Willamette University’s medical program moved to Portland in 1879 and Plummer returned to teaching at the school . He was the first dean of the school, and also taught materia medica and therapeutics. Plummer left the school after three years to concentrate on his drug store. He bought a new home in 1881, and remodeled the building. In 1891, he relocated the store to Third and Madison, and his store became the home of the first telephone in the city.

Plummer was a member of the United States Examining Surgeons, serving as the secretary of the board on several occasions. He also helped found the State Medical Society of Oregon and was later appointed by Governor Sylvester Pennoyer to the newly created State Board of Medical Examiners. Plummer spent some time as a professor at the University of Oregon’s medical school, located in Portland. That school and the Willamette medical college were merged in 1913 and later became Oregon Health & Science University.

== Political career ==
In 1865, Plummer entered politics and was elected as a city council member for Portland. He served one term on the council, from 1865 to 1866. In 1880, he was elected to the Oregon House of Representatives from Multnomah County (where Portland is located) as a Republican in District 41. He won re-election to a second two-year term in 1882, but represented District 39 during that session. He only served during the 1880 and 1882 legislative sessions. Plummer also served as chairman of the Republicans' city and county conventions for one year.

== Later years and legacy ==
Plummer was a horticulturalist and owned a 20-acre (81,000 m^{2}) fruit farm that was then southwest of Portland. There he introduced the Italian prune to the state. In 1865, he helped found the First Presbyterian Church and Society of the City of Portland. Plummer was an elder at the church for decades, and also helped organize another Presbyterian Church in South Portland. He was a member of the Masons and of the Al Kader Temple. Orlando Plummer died on December 7, 1913, in Portland at the age of 77.
