= Rodney Glisan =

American medical doctor

Rodney L. Glisan, M.D. (/ˈɡlɪsən/; January 29, 1827 – June 3, 1890) was an American medical doctor who served on the frontier in the United States Army and was well known as a medical authority in the 19th century.

== Biography ==
He was born in Linganore in Frederick County, Maryland, the son of Samuel and Eliza Glisan. He graduated from the University of Maryland medical school in 1849. He practiced medicine for a year in Baltimore and then in 1850 he was appointed assistant surgeon in the United States Army. He served as medical officer in the army for eleven years including five years on the Great Plains followed by six years (1855–1861) in Oregon during the Indian wars.

He resigned his commission in 1861 and practiced medicine in San Francisco before moving to Portland, Oregon. In 1863 he married Elizabeth Raynes Couch, a daughter of John H. Couch, one of the founders of Portland. From 1872–1876 he was president of the Multnomah County Medical Society, and was president of Oregon state medical society from 1875–1876. He was a member for many years of the American Medical Association. He later became a professor of obstetrics and diseases of women at Willamette University School of Medicine.

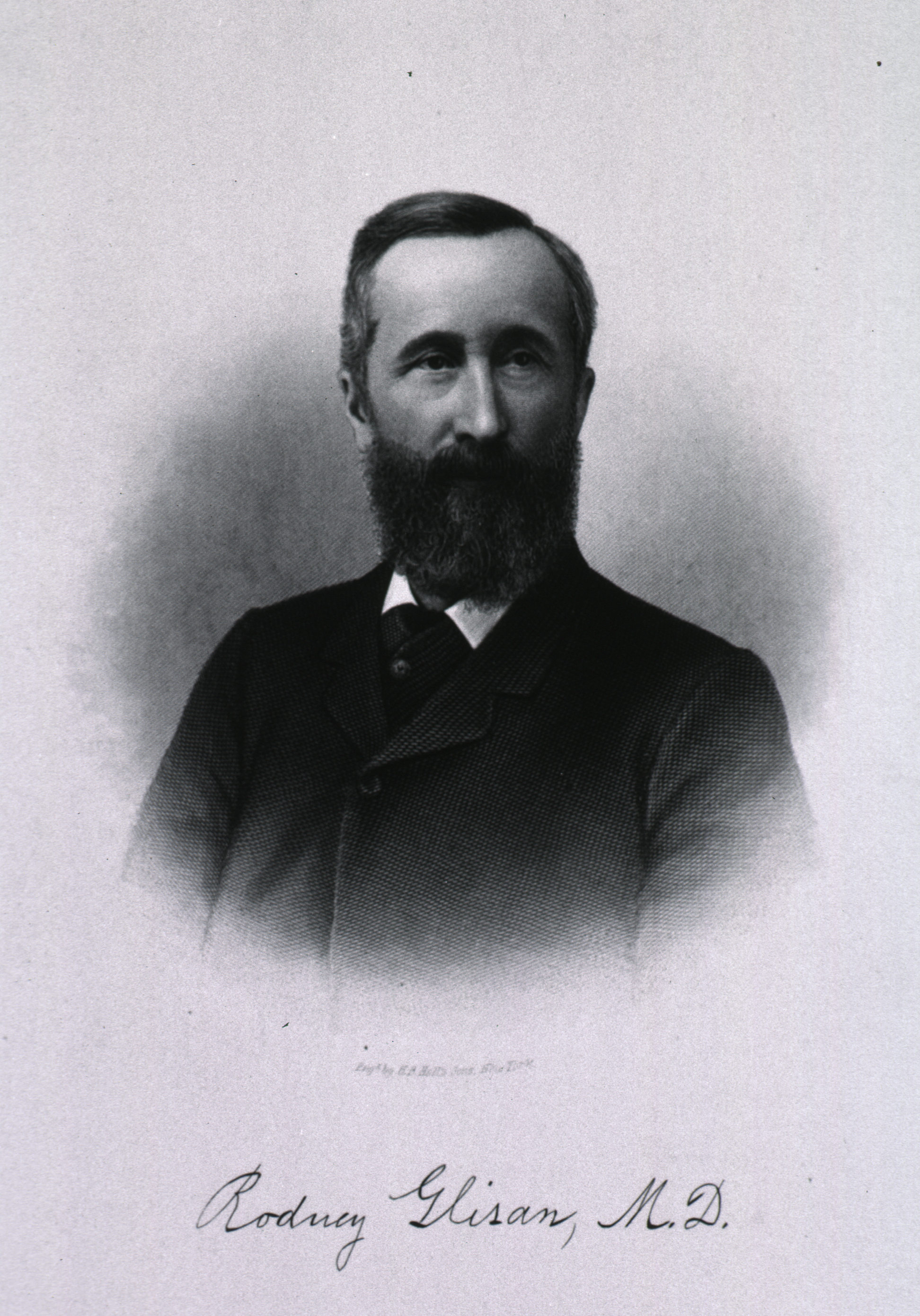
Dr. Rodney L. Glisan

Glisan achieved a measure of fame as a medical doctor in his day. He was widely published and known as an authority in his field. In 1874 he published Journal of Army Life about his years as a surgeon in the Army. He traveled extensively throughout Europe and Central America delivering lectures on medical subjects, and in 1887 published Two Years in Europe.

He is noted for performing the first amputation of the shoulder and thigh, and the second operation for strangulated inguinal hernia in the Pacific Northwest. In 1881 he published a text on midwifery that was widely used in the United States and Great Britain. That year he was also a delegate to the Seventh International Medical Congress. In 1893 the donation of his library became the basis for the library of the Oregon Health and Science University.

== Legacy ==
Glisan is honored by the naming of a street in Northwest and Northeast Portland, Oregon.
