= Zirconate =

Group of chemical compounds

A zirconate is an oxyanion containing zirconium. Examples include Na_{2}ZrO_{3}, CaZrO_{3} and Cs_{2}ZrO_{3} which can be prepared by fusing zirconium dioxide with Na_{2}O, CaO and CsOH respectively.

== See also ==
- Cs_{2}ZrO_{3}
