= Willamette University College of Medicine =

Former medical school in Oregon

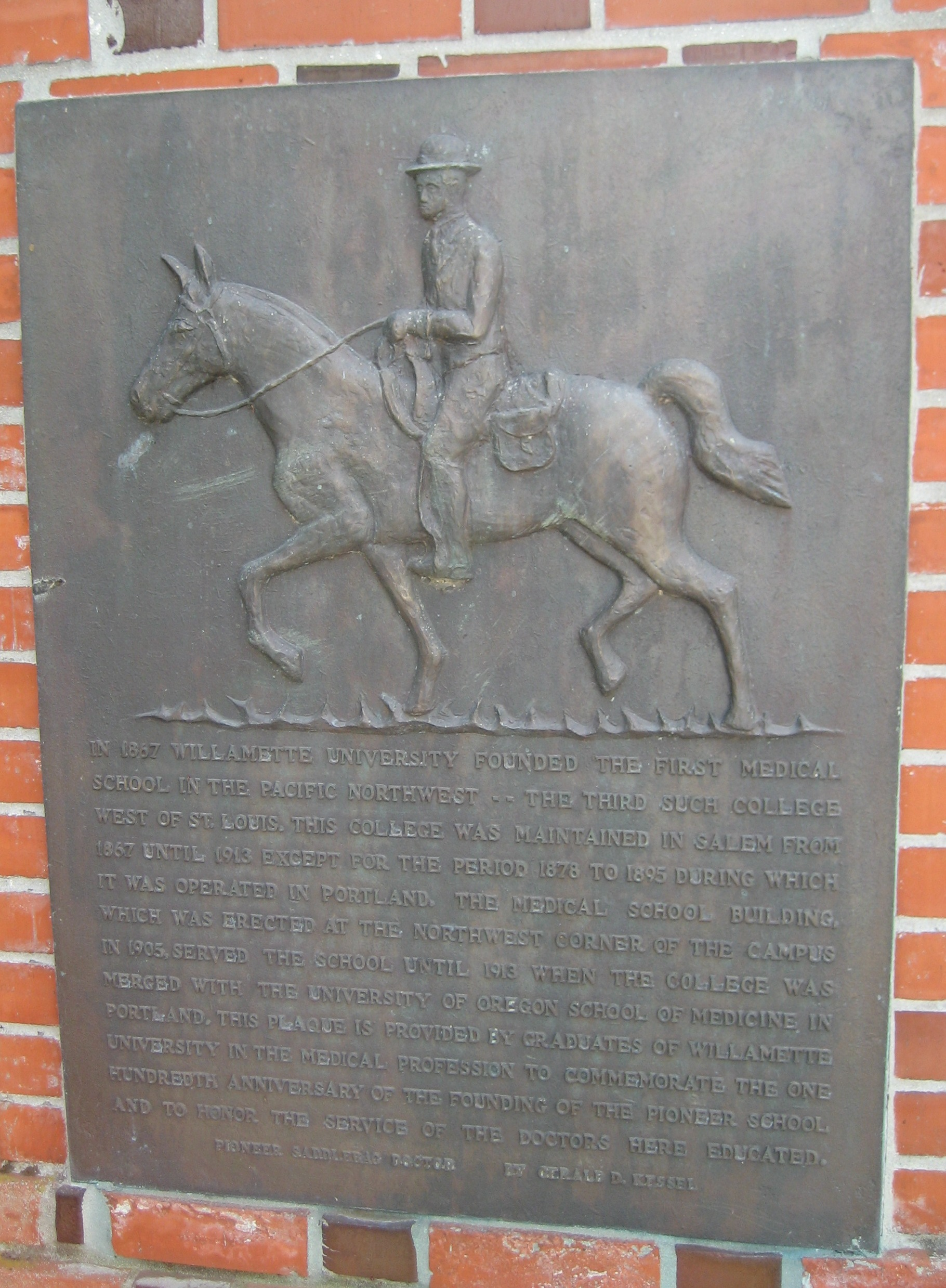
- Type: Private, Not-for-profit, Nonsectarian
- Established: 1867
- Location: Salem, Oregon, USA
- Fate: Merged with University of Oregon and later broke away to become a fully independent school known as OHSU

Willamette University College of Medicine is a former school of medicine that was part of Willamette University. Founded in 1867 as the first medical school in Oregon, the school relocated between Portland and the main university campus in Salem several times. The school was merged with the University of Oregon's medical school in Portland in 1913. In 1974, the school was separated from the University of Oregon and later renamed the Oregon Health & Science University (OHSU). Today, the school is a fully independent institution, operating under the direction of the Oregon State System of Higher Education. OHSU is now Oregon's only public medical school/health center and one of just 125 in the nation.

== History ==
In 1867, the College of Medicine was officially organized at Willamette. The school opened with 24 students led by Dr. Horace Carpenter. For two years prior the school had been teaching medicine. University president Joseph H. Wythe was one of the people credited with starting the school, but left due to internal faculty strife. Wythe taught several classes as well, including hygiene and microscopy at the medical school. Wythe had attended Philadelphia College of Medicine and graduated in 1850 before serving in the Civil War. In 1874, the school had 14 students and 11 professors. Women were attending the school of medicine by 1877. At this time the department was located in Waller Hall, then named University Hall.

In 1880 the College of Medicine moved to Portland, but returned to the Salem campus in 1895 in a dispute over privileges at the hospital. The school returned to Waller Hall, and also used other buildings in the area. Then in 1906 the school moved into a new building on the northwest section of the campus. By 1909 the school had an enrollment of 29 and a staff of 16. At that time entering students were not required to have even completed high school.

== Merger ==
On September 1, 1913, the College of Medicine officially merged with the University of Oregon's medical school. Willamette's faculty retired and the 40 students transferred to Oregon's medical campus. At that time the University of Oregon's school was located in northwest Portland, Oregon on the campus of Good Samaritan Hospital. In 1919 the school would re-locate to Marquam Hill in southwest Portland where the school still stands as OHSU. Today, the school works closely with Oregon State University's pre-med program.

== Alumni and faculty ==
- Otto Saly Binswanger, professor
- George H. Burnett, professor.
- Melvin Clark George, professor
- Rodney Glisan, professor
- Harry Lane (1855–1917), graduated in 1878
- Ross T. McIntire, (1889–1960), graduated in 1912
- John H. Mitchell (1835–1905), professor of medical jurisprudence.
- Orlando Plummer (1836–1913), professor and dean
- Levi L. Rowland (1831–1908), alumni, professor, and dean
- Loyal B. Stearns (1853–1936), alumni

== See also ==
- Oregon Institute
- Methodist Mission
