= Otto Saly Binswanger =

American chemist (1854–1917)

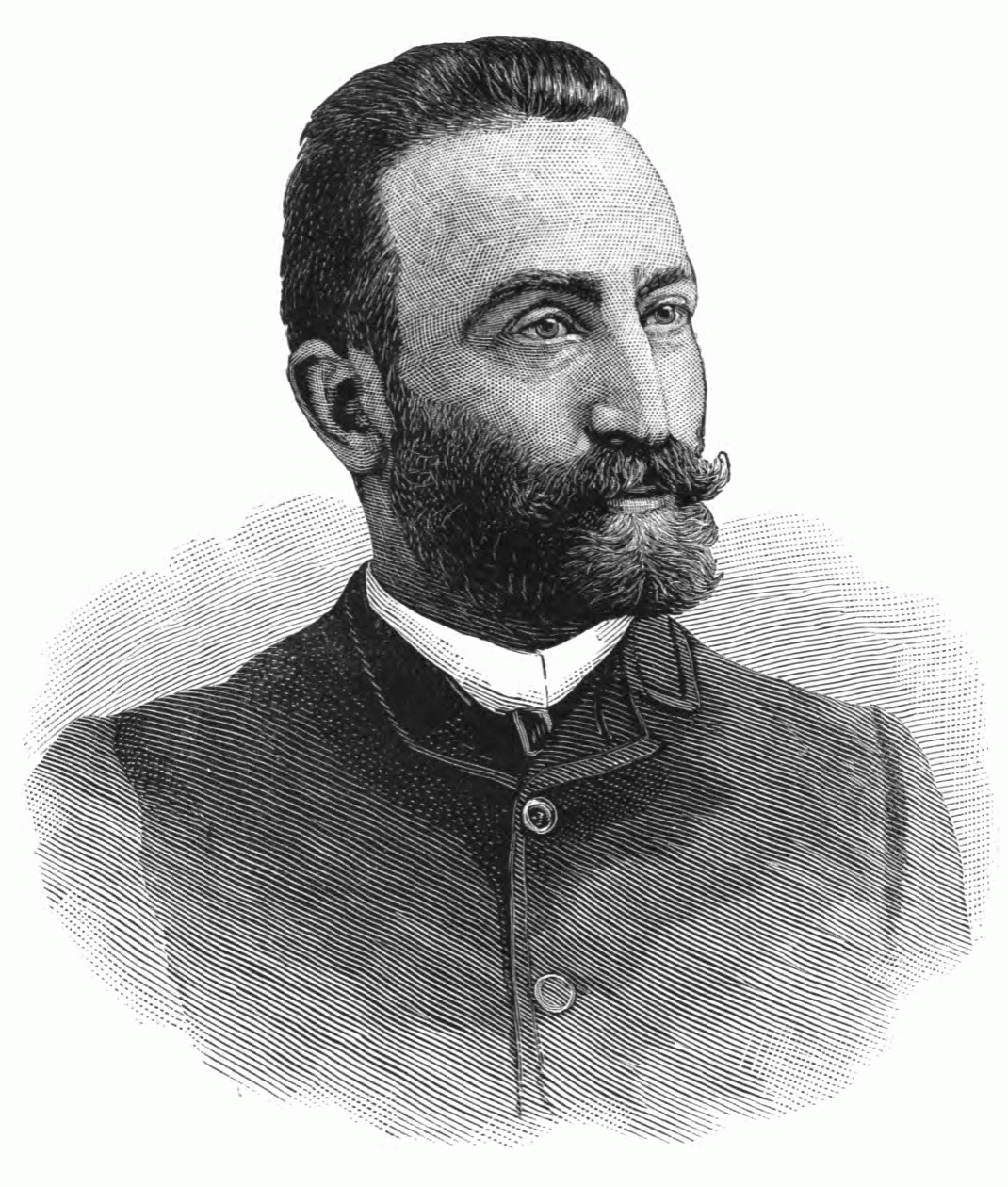
- Otto S. Binswanger (from Julian Hawthorne, The Story of Oregon, vol. 2, 1892)
- Born: April 20, 1854; Osterberg, Bavaria
- Died: September 25, 1917 (aged 63); Portland, Oregon, U.S.
- Education: Munich Polytechnic School; University of Erlangen; University of Maryland
- Scientific career
- Fields: Chemistry, Toxicology
- Workplaces: Willamette University College of Medicine; University of Oregon Medical School
- Thesis: Ein Beitrag zur Kenntniss des Kresols und einiger Derivate (1877)
- Doctoral advisor: Eugen von Gorup Besanez

Otto Saly Binswanger (April 20, 1854, in Osterberg, Bavaria – September 25, 1917, in Portland, Oregon) was a German-American chemist and toxicologist.

== Life ==
Born to the noted Binswanger family (named after the town Binswangen) and of German-Jewish descent, Otto Saly (Salomon) Binswanger was raised and schooled in Augsburg.

Apart from a one-year interruption for obligatory military service in 1873-74, Binswanger attended the Chemical/Technical Department of the newly founded Munich Polytechnic School as an auditor (not an enrolled student) between 1872 and 1876. In October 1876, he enrolled at the University of Erlangen, where he completed his Ph.D. dissertation on cresol and its derivatives under the direction of Eugen von Gorup Besanez in November 1877.

Binswanger emigrated to the U.S., where he enrolled at the University of Maryland in Baltimore. After three years of study, he completed a medical doctorate in May 1882.

Following his medical studies, Binswanger moved to Portland, Oregon, where he was a general practitioner. In December 1883, he was appointed to a professorship in chemistry and toxicology at the Willamette University College of Medicine in Salem. In 1886, he and several colleagues relocated to the newly founded University of Oregon Medical School in Portland (now Oregon Health & Science University), where he taught until his death.

== Dissertation ==
Ein Beitrag zur Kenntniss des Kresols und einiger Derivate. Inaugural-Dissertation zur Erlangung der Doctorwürde bei der hochlöblichen philosophischen Facultät der Universität Erlangen, eingereicht von Saly Binswanger aus Augsburg. Erlangen: Jacob, 1877. 21 pp.

== Literature ==
Julian Hawthorne, The Story of Oregon. A History, with Portraits and Biographies. New York: American Historical Publishing Co., 1892, vol. 2, pp. 377f.
