= Robert B. Dashiell =

US Navy officer

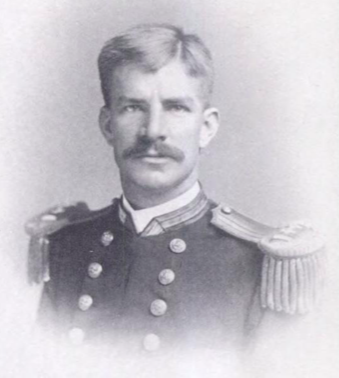
- Born: July 29, 1860; Woodville, Virginia, U.S.
- Died: March 8, 1899 (aged 38); Washington, D.C., U.S.
- Burial place: United States Naval Academy Cemetery, Annapolis, Maryland, U.S.
- Military career
- Allegiance: United States of America
- Branch: United States Navy
- Service years: 1883–1899
- Rank: Assistant Naval Constructor
- Unit: Naval Construction Corps (1895–1899)

Robert Brooke Dashiell (July 29, 1860 – March 8, 1899) was an officer in the United States Navy noted for his naval ordnance technical expertise.

== Biography ==
Dashiell was born in 1860 near Woodville, Virginia. He graduated from the United States Naval Academy in 1881, ranked seventh in his class. One of his classmates was John W. Weeks, who later served in Congress and was Secretary of War from 1921 to 1925. Following his graduation, Dashiell served for 16 months on the USS Essex.

Dashiell was commissioned as an ensign on July 1, 1883. First assigned to the naval ordnance department, he was transferred in 1885 to the USS Pensacola, under the command of then-Captain George Dewey. He served on the Pensacola until early 1888, when he was again assigned to naval ordnance.

In 1889, Dashiell received an honorary Master of Arts degree from St. John's College in Annapolis, Maryland. He was dispatched by the Bureau of Ordnance to construct a naval ordnance center in Indian Head, Maryland, where he served as Inspector in Charge of Ordnance from 1890 to 1893. The resulting facility, Naval Support Facility Indian Head, has played a significant role in ordnance development and testing for the United States.

In May 1893, Dashiell was assigned to the armored cruiser USS New York. In December of that year, he was promoted to lieutenant junior grade. In 1895, while still serving on the New York, he resigned as a line officer and was appointed a staff corps officer in the Naval Construction Corps. An inventor of important ordnance mechanisms and an authority on dock construction, he was commissioned Assistant Naval Constructor on February 7, 1895.

Dashiell served in his specialty until his death due to meningitis in 1899 in Washington, D.C. He was survived by his wife and three children. A brother, Paul Dashiell, was a professor and football coach at the Naval Academy. One of his daughters, Eleanor, married future Army major general Julian Hatcher in October 1910. Another daughter, Nancy, married future Navy vice admiral Thomas Leigh Gatch in June 1917.

In 1943, the destroyer USS Dashiell (DD-659) was named in his honor. The Dashiell was commissioned 20 March 1943 and decommissioned 29 April 1960.
