= Ross T. McIntire =

American physician and US Navy admiral (1889–1959)

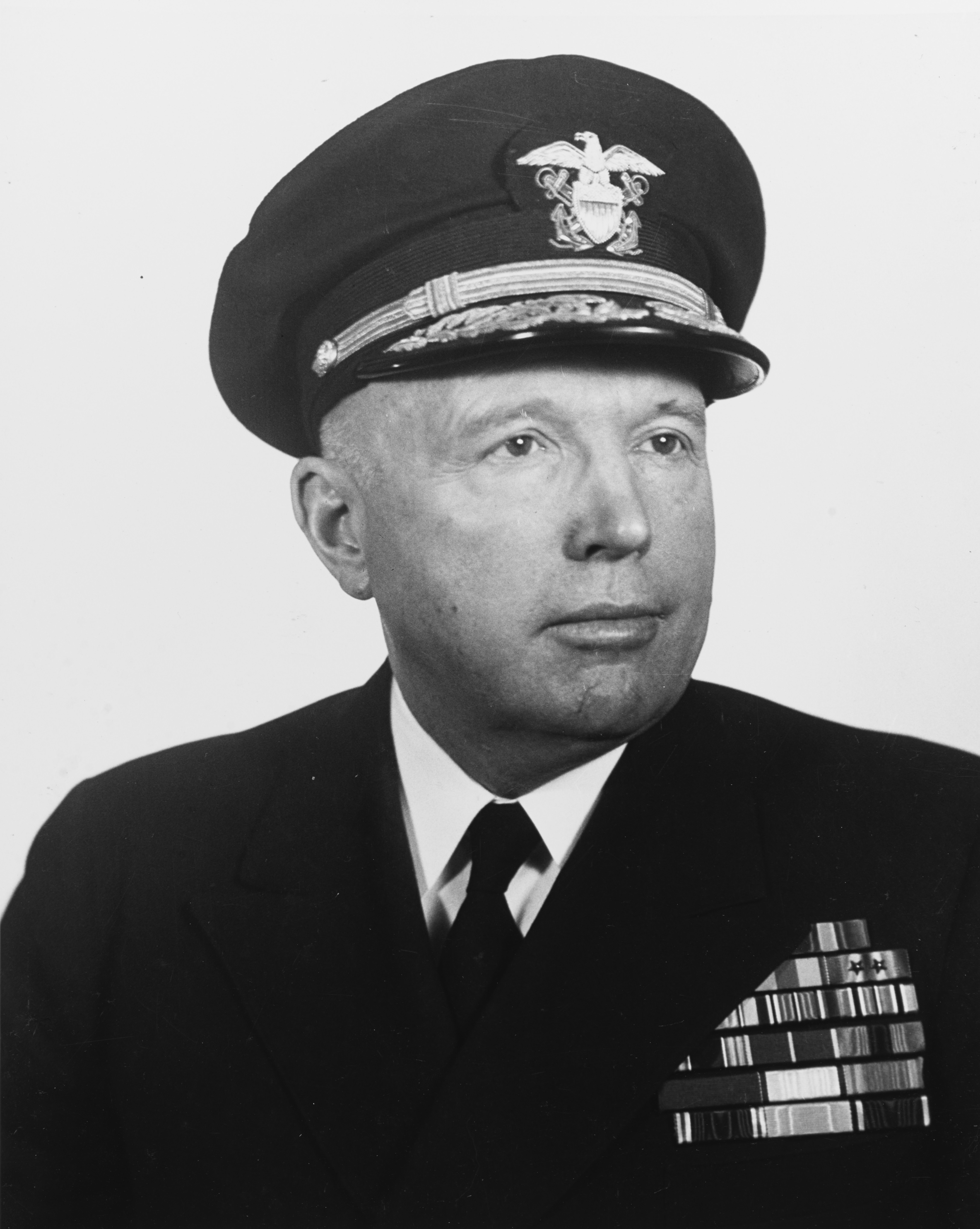
- McIntire as a vice admiral

Physician to the President
- In office 1933–1944
- President: Franklin D. Roosevelt
- Preceded by: Joel Thompson Boone
- Succeeded by: Howard G. Bruenn

Surgeon General of the United States Navy
- In office 1938–1946
- Preceded by: Percival S. Rossiter
- Succeeded by: Clifford A. Swanson

Personal details
- Born: Ross Thomas McIntire; August 11, 1889 Salem, Oregon, U.S.
- Died: December 8, 1959 (aged 70) Chicago, Illinois, U.S.
- Resting place: Arlington National Cemetery
- Education: Willamette University College of Medicine

Military service
- Allegiance: United States
- Branch/service: United States Navy
- Years of service: 1917–1946
- Rank: Vice Admiral
- Unit: Medical Corps
- Battles/wars: World War II

Ross Thomas McIntire (August 11, 1889 – December 8, 1959) was an American physician and United States Navy officer. An otolaryngologist, he was appointed physician to President Franklin Roosevelt in 1933, becoming the first Physician to the President with a board-certified speciality. In 1938, he became the Surgeon General of the United States Navy, overseeing a major expansion of the Bureau of Medicine and Surgery during World War II. Following his retirement from the Navy with the rank of vice admiral, he held many senior positions in medical institutions, including Chairman of the President's Committee on Employment of the Physically Handicapped.

== Early life ==
Ross T. McIntire was born on August 11, 1889, in Salem, Oregon. He attended Willamette University College of Medicine in Oregon, and graduated in 1912.

== Naval career ==
In 1917, he was commissioned as an assistant surgeon in the Medical Corps of the United States Navy. He met Franklin D. Roosevelt, who was Assistant Secretary of the Navy at the time, and when Roosevelt became President of the United States, McIntire was appointed Physician to the President in 1932. As a board certified otolaryngologist, he became the first White House physician to have a specialty certification. McIntire remained in the Navy when he became Surgeon General of the Navy in 1938, being elevated to the rank of rear admiral. Holding office during World War II, he oversaw the expansion of the Bureau of Medicine and Surgery to a size larger than the size of the entire navy during peacetime. He also lobbied the President and Congress to establish the National Naval Medical Center in Bethesda, Maryland. In 1944, he was promoted to vice admiral. He retired from these two positions and the Navy in 1946.

== Later life ==
From 1947 to 1954, McIntire served as the first Chairman of the President's Committee on Employment of the Physically Handicapped. He was also a member of the National Board of Medical Examiners, the American Foundation for Tropical Medicine, and the Health and Medical Committee of the National Research Council. He was the executive director of the International College of Surgeons, a member of the board of governors of the American College of Surgeons, and the director of the National Blood Bank Program of the American Red Cross. Near the end of his life, he was chairman of the Ad Hoc Committee on a Census of the Handicapped. He was also a participant in the Marine Corps War Memorial Foundation.

He died suddenly on December 8, 1959, in Chicago, Illinois. A Methodist funeral was held in the chapel at Fort Myer, and he was buried with full military honors in Arlington National Cemetery.

== Bibliography ==
- McIntire, Ross T. (1946). White House Physician. New York: G. P. Putnam's Sons. OCLC 938667069.

Military offices
Preceded by Joel Thompson Boone	Physician to the President; 1932–1944	Succeeded by Howard G. Bruenn
Preceded by Perceval S. Rossiter	Surgeon General of the United States Navy; 1938–1946	Succeeded by Clifford A. Swanson
