= Badmashulu =

- Theatrical release poster
- Directed by: Shankar Cheguri
- Produced by: C.Rama Shankar
- Starring: Mahesh Chinthala; Vidya Sagar Karampuri; Muralidhar Goud; Deeksha Koteshwar; Kavitha Srirangam; Sudhakar Reddy Kethiri; Anjaiah N
- Cinematography: Vineeth Pabbathi
- Edited by: Gajjala Rakshith Kumar
- Music by: Teja Kunuru
- Production company: Thara Story Tellers
- Release date: 6 June 2025
- Running time: 158 Minutes
- Country: India
- Language: Telugu

Badmashulu is a 2025 Indian Telugu-language film directed by Shankar Cheguri. The film stars Mahesh Chinthala, Vidya Sagar Karampuri, Muralidhar Goud, Deeksha Koteshwar, Kavitha Srirangam, Sudhakar Reddy Kethiri and Anjaiah N. Music scored by Teja Kunuru,edited by Gajjala Rakshith Kumar and camera by Vineeth Pabbathi.

== Plot ==
The film is set in the fictional village of Kothulagudem and follows the lives of Tirupati, a trailer repairman, and Muthyalu, a barber two habitual drunkards known to the villagers as the "Badmaashulu." Often engaging in petty thefts to support their addictions, the pair show little concern for their families or responsibilities. Their reckless behavior continues even after they are arrested for a minor theft, as they cause trouble while in police custody. The situation escalates when a school computer containing important alumni data goes missing, and suspicion falls on the duo. With Constable Ramachander investigating the case, Tirupati and Muthyalu must confront their actions, assist in finding the real culprit, and begin a journey toward redemption.

== Cast ==
- Mahesh Chinthala
- Vidya Sagar Karampuri
- Muralidhar Goud
- Deeksha Koteshwar
- Kavitha Srirangam
- Sudhakar Reddy Kethiri
- Anjaiah N

== Soundtrack ==
The film's music is composed by Teja Kunuru.

== Release ==
The film was released theatrically on 6 June 2025.

== Critical reception ==
Aditya Devulapally of Cinema Express gave the film 2.5/5 stars and wrote, "Badmashulu may not be a groundbreaking work of comedy, but its low-key absurdity and lived-in charm are refreshing. It is a film that ambles, stumbles, and sometimes stalls, but never loses its sincerity." DC Coresspondent said Overall, "Badmashulu" is a light-hearted comedy film. Suhas Sistu of Hans India said Badmaashulu thrives on its slice-of-life narrative and humorous depiction of rural Telangana.
