= Light Heart (balloon) =

Balloon used during an unsuccessful crossing of the Atlantic Ocean

Light Heart was a balloon constructed by Colonel Thomas Leigh Gatch Jr., USAR (13 September 1925 – disappeared 19 February 1974) for an unsuccessful attempt at the first crossing of the Atlantic Ocean by balloon.

Gatch was the son of Vice Admiral Thomas Leigh Gatch (1891–1954) and grandson of photographer Helen Gatch (1862–1942).

== Balloon design ==
The balloon consisted of a sealed and pressurized envelope suspended from a cluster of ten helium balloons. Each of these was a superpressure balloon (also known as a constant pressure or positive pressure balloon.) In theory, such a balloon can retain a constant altitude over very long-distance flights of several days' duration, since the volume of the envelope remains relatively constant over time. Changes in the pressure of the gas due to heating and cooling are accommodated by mitigating the temperature changes and using an inelastic envelope. The sealed and insulated gondola, which Gatch constructed at home, was designed to maintain the same partial pressure of oxygen as at sea level (40% oxygen at 0.5 atmospheres).

== Flight plan ==
Gatch intended to fly the Atlantic (solo) from Harrisburg Airport, Pennsylvania, to somewhere in Western Europe in a little over two days. The theory underlying this plan was that he would be able to maintain a constant altitude of 12,000m (39,000 ft); at this altitude the jet stream should carry his aircraft from North America to Europe in the time planned.

== Flight and disappearance ==
Light Heart took off from Harrisburg Airport at 19:29 hours on 18 February 1974. By 21:00 the balloon was reported to have stabilized at 10,200m (33,500 ft), having passed over Dover, Delaware, and Atlantic City, New Jersey. Gatch reported that one of the ten helium balloons had burst during the ascent (at 20:45). While the balloon was able to continue in this condition, he had been forced to jettison water ballast to continue climbing and he was now able to cruise at no more than 11,000m (36,000 ft), rather than the 12,000m (39,000 ft) he had originally intended.

For the next sixteen hours Gatch maintained radio contact with passing airliners (at least two of which were diverted to avoid his craft). His last radio contact was at 12:50 on Tuesday, 19 February, with BOAC Flight 583. At that point, the balloon was 1,490 km (925 miles) northeast of San Juan, Puerto Rico. Light Heart continued to drift southwards out of the main transatlantic airways, far south of Gatch's plotted course.

No further radio transmissions were received from Light Heart. The Liberian freighter Ore Meridian reported sighting the balloon just after dawn on 21 February. At that point, the balloon was at an altitude of about 305 m (1000 ft), approximately 1,610 km (1,000 miles) west of the Canary Islands and drifting towards Africa. According to this report, eight of the ten balloons remained inflated. The gondola was designed to float in the event of a water landing and to be radar reflective. Notwithstanding this (or conjectures that the balloon might have landed in the Spanish Sahara) no confirmed trace of Light Heart or Gatch was ever found, after the Ore Meridian's reported sighting on 21 February.

The US Department of Defense and the Spanish Army conducted extensive search operations both at sea off West Africa and in the Spanish Sahara. Search operations were called off in mid-March 1974.

== See also ==
- List of people who disappeared mysteriously at sea
