= Caesium zirconate =

Names
- IUPAC name dicesium;dioxido(oxo)zirconium

Identifiers
CAS Number	12158-58-6
3D model (JSmol)	Interactive image
ChemSpider	32816981
ECHA InfoCard	100.032.064
EC Number	235-284-7
PubChem CID	92026610
- InChI: InChI=1S/2Cs.3O.Zr/q2*+1;;2*-1; Key: ITVUVIOQJJSLQJ-UHFFFAOYSA-N
- SMILES: [O-][Zr](=O)[O-].[Cs+].[Cs+]

Properties
Chemical formula	Cs_{2}O_{3}Zr
Molar mass	405.032 g·mol^{−1}
Appearance	white powder
Melting point	1,010 °C (1,850 °F; 1,280 K)

Hazards
- GHS labelling
Pictograms	(GHS07: Exclamation mark)
Signal word	Warning
- Except where otherwise noted, data are given for materials in their standard state (at 25 °C [77 °F], 100 kPa). Infobox references

Caesium zirconate is an inorganic compound of caesium, oxygen, and zirconium with the chemical formula Cs_{2}ZrO_{3}.

== Preparation ==
Caesium zirconate can be prepared from the reaction of CsOH with zirconia at high temperature:

2 CsOH + ZrO_{2} → Cs_{2}ZrO_{3} + H_{2}O
