= Sarwan =

Sarwan may refer to:

== People ==
- Ramnaresh Sarwan (born 1980), former West Indian cricketer
- Sarwan Singh Phillaur, Indian politician, minister in the Punjab, India

== Places ==
- Sarwan, Deoghar, a community development block in Deoghar district, Jharkhand, India

- Sarwan, Deoghar (village), a village in Jharkhand, India

- Sarwan, Raebareli, a village in Uttar Pradesh, India
- Sarwan Khera, a town in Kanpur Dehat district, Uttar Pradesh, India

== Religion and mythology ==
- Sarwan, an uthra (angel) in Mandaeism
