= Larin =

Larin may refer to:

- Larin (name)
- Larin (currency) used around the Persian Gulf and Arabian Sea
- Larin izbor, a Croatian telenovela
- A brand name of ethinylestradiol/norethisterone acetate, a combined oral contraceptive
