= Douane =

Douane or Douanes may refer to:

- Customs, an authority or agency in a country responsible for collecting tariffs and for controlling the flow of goods into and out of a country
- Custom house, traditionally a building housing the offices for above authority or agency
- Directorate-General of Customs and Indirect Taxes (French: Direction générale des douanes et droits indirects), a law enforcement agency in France
- Douane, part of the Tax and Customs Administration, a service of the government of the Netherlands
- Douanes, a system of taxation through custom duties in the Kingdom of France during the reign of King Louis XIV
- Douanes (ballet), by Geoffrey Toye
- AS Douanes (disambiguation), several sport clubs
