= Budmash =

Hindi, Urdu and Persian colloquial term

Budmash, alternately Badmaash, is a term for a notorious person, used in colloquial as well as formal Hindi, Urdu or Persian. Often the term is also used in an endearing way within family and friends to imply playful notoriety.

In popular culture, the term has also been used in movie titles such as Badmaa$h Company (2010), and the chartbuster song titled "Babli Badmaash Hai" from the movie Shootout at Wadala (2013).
