= Thomas Leigh Gatch =

20th century American naval officer

- Gatch as a young Naval officer
- Born: August 9, 1891; Salem, Oregon, U.S.
- Died: December 16, 1954 (aged 63); San Diego, California, U.S.
- Burial place: Fort Rosecrans National Cemetery, San Diego, California
- Military career
- Allegiance: United States of America
- Branch: United States Navy
- Service years: 1912–1947
- Rank: Vice Admiral
- Commands: Judge Advocate General; Atlantic Fleet service force USS South Dakota
- Conflicts: World War I World War II: Battle of the Santa Cruz Islands
- Awards: Navy Cross (2); Purple Heart

Thomas Leigh Gatch (August 9, 1891 – December 16, 1954) was an American naval officer and attorney in the 20th century. A native of Oregon, and grandson of educator Thomas Milton Gatch, he served in the United States Navy as a ship commander during World War II and Judge Advocate General of the Navy from 1943 to 1945. His last command was as commander of the Atlantic Fleet's service force.

== Early life ==
Thomas L. Gatch was born on August 9, 1891, in Salem, Oregon to Claude Gatch and Helen Plummer. His grandfather had been the president of Willamette University in Salem, and both his father and grandfather served as mayor of the town. From 1906 to 1908, Thomas began his college career at Oregon Agricultural College where his grandfather served as president from 1897 to 1907. However he later transferred to the United States Naval Academy in Annapolis, Maryland and graduated in 1912.

== Naval career ==
After college, Gatch spent five years at sea before joining the Navy's Judge Advocate General's Office (JAG) in 1919 in Washington, D.C. In D.C., he studied law at George Washington University Law School where in 1922 he earned his LL.B. degree. Gatch then went back to active duty aboard a ship, before teaching for three years at the Naval Academy. In 1927, he attended the junior course at the Naval War College.

In 1935, Gatch returned to the JAG's headquarters where he remained through 1938. He then returned to sea until 1940. Gatch was promoted to captain on July 1, 1939. In 1940, he began serving as Assistant Judge Advocate General, keeping that post until February 1942 after World War II began. Gatch then became commander of the USS South Dakota, a South Dakota-class battleship. Serving in the South Pacific until December 1942, commanding the South Dakota in the Pacific Theater of Operations in battles such as the Battle of the Santa Cruz Islands during the Guadalcanal campaign. He received two Navy Crosses for his service. Gatch's time in command was not without controversy. He was, correctly or incorrectly, blamed for a number of incidents involving his command; the grounding of his ship in Tonga in mid-1942, his collision with the destroyer Mahan in late 1942, and the inclusion in his crew of a 12-year-old boy - Calvin Graham - who was wounded during the Guadalcanal campaign. While Gatch's time in command was not without victory and success, his reports were often criticized for gross exaggerations of success. Gatch's actions during the Naval Battle of Guadalcanal included a fateful decision to initially engage the Japanese battleship Kirishima with his secondary battery only. During the subsequent fighting, the South Dakota suffered significant casualties, among them Gatch. Gatch was injured by shell splinters when the bridge of the South Dakota was struck by shells from the Kirishima.

In 1943, Gatch was invalided to shore duty, officially due to his wounds. He became the 16th Judge Advocate General of the United States Navy. Gatch was promoted to rear admiral with seniority dating from September 5, 1942. He remained in that position until December 3, 1945, when he became the commander of the service force of the Atlantic Fleet, receiving a promotion to vice admiral seven days later. Vice Admiral Thomas Leigh Gatch retired from the Navy in 1947.

== Later life and family ==
From 1945 to 1947, Gatch served as a trustee at George Washington University. Thomas had one sibling, Orytha.

Gatch married Nancy Weems Dashiell, a daughter of naval ordnance expert Robert B. Dashiell, in June 1917. They had three children: Thomas Jr., Nancy, and Eleanor. His son attended the United States Military Academy, and disappeared in 1974 whilst attempting the first balloon crossing of the Atlantic Ocean, in the Light Heart.

After retiring from the Navy, Gatch returned to his native Oregon where he joined the law firm of Boyd, Ferris & Erwin in Portland. Gatch died on December 16, 1954, at the Naval Hospital Balboa in San Diego, California, and is buried there at Fort Rosecrans National Cemetery.
