= Thomas Benton Gatch =

American politician

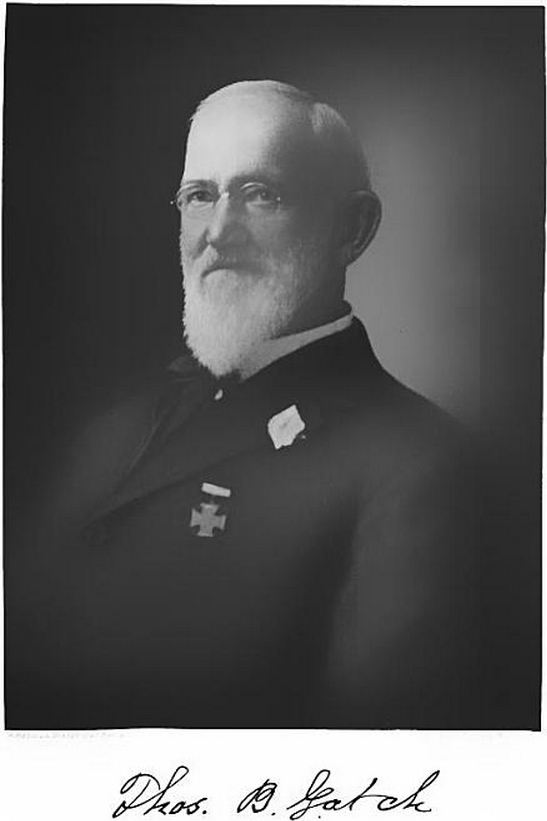
Major Thomas Gatch

Thomas Benton Gatch (May 21, 1841 − December 25, 1933) was an officer in the Confederate Army during the American Civil War and politician and businessman afterwards.

== Biography ==
He was born in Baltimore County, Maryland, on May 21, 1841. His parents were Nicholas Gatch and Anna Maria Gatch (née Merryman). He graduated from the Norfolk Military Academy in Virginia in 1859, and began studying medicine at Columbia College in Washington D.C. that fall, but the Civil War changed his plans, and he joined the Confederate Army in May 1861 as a private in Turner Ashby's regiment. He was promoted to first sergeant by the Battle of Gettysburg, where he was a courier for General Robert E. Lee. At Gettysburg he was made a captain, and later in the battle was taken prisoner. He remained at the prison camp at Fort Delaware for the rest of the war.

He participated in both the first and second Battles of Bull Run, and the battles of Cedar Mountain, Fredericksburg, Antietam, Morton's Ford, New Market, and in Stonewall Jackson's Valley campaigns. He was wounded multiple times. He joined the Maryland National Guard after the war and was promoted to the rank of major in 1868. That year he married Josephine Forester, and they had nine sons and three daughters; one of the daughters died as a young child. Among other jobs he worked for twenty-one years in the office of the clerk of Baltimore County, before setting up a quarrying and contracting company, T. B. Gatch & Sons, with seven of his sons.

In 1871 he was elected to the Maryland House of Delegates and was a Democrat. He died on December 25, 1933, at his home in Baltimore.
