= Helen Gatch =

American photographer (1862–1942)

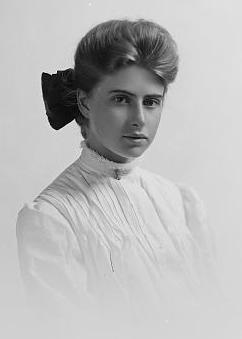
- Helen Gatch, c. 1905

First Lady of Salem, Oregon
- In office 1893–1896
- Mayor: Claude Gatch

Personal details
- Born: Helen Plummer; April 13, 1862 Alton, Illinois, U.S.
- Died: January 11, 1942 (aged 79) Oakland, California, U.S.
- Spouse: Claude Gatch
- Children: 2 (including Thomas Leigh Gatch)
- Parent(s): Orlando Plummer (father); Sarah B. Cool (mother)
- Relatives: Emma Plummer Chadwick (sister)
- Occupation: painter photographer

Helen Plummer Gatch (née Plummer; 1862–1942) was an American painter and photographer known for depicting family members and views of the Oregon Coast.

== Early life and education ==
Born in Alton, Illinois, on April 13, 1862, she was one of three daughters of Dr. Orlando P. S. Plummer and Sarah B. Cool. After the death of her mother, the family moved to Portland, Oregon, in 1864.

In 1885, she married Claude Gatch (1859–1939), and they moved to Salem, where he was elected mayor in 1893. Their two children were Orytha "Ryth" (1886–?) and Thomas Leigh "Tam" (1891–1954). The family moved to Berkeley, California, in 1912.

== Critical reception ==
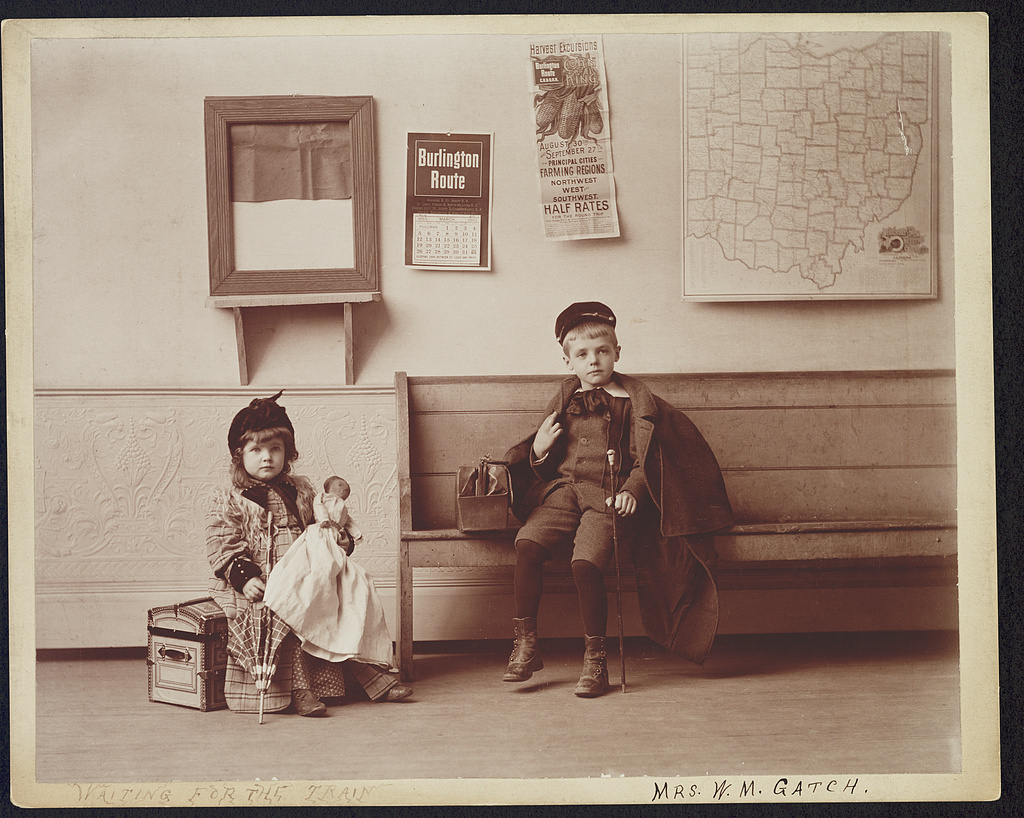
Waiting for the train, 1893 photo by Helen Gatch

Biographer Roger Hull wrote that Gatch was once a central figure in Pacific Coast pictorial photography, but that she was "an entirely displaced person in the standard histories of the medium." Hull cites as possible reasons for this neglect of her work that it was "'set aside' for reasons of provincialism, changes in aesthetic taste, gender, the politicized world of American photography" and perhaps "her own later indifference".

According to archivist Sharon Howe, "Although she did not construct stage sets for her photographs as other pictorialists did, Gatch used composition, costuming, and titles to pictorialize her subjects and to produce Dutch genre images... Gatch used prominent Salem homes and friends as sets and models for her pictorial photography. She also photographed at the family summer house on the Oregon Coast near Newport."

Gatch's earliest known photograph was of the Oregon Insane Asylum in 1891, and in 1894, her photo "Romeo and Juliet" won the US$25 first prize from the Photo American magazine. Her prints, shown nationally between 1895 and 1905, were published in international press, as well as locally in Salem and Portland.

In 1902, Camera Craft reviewed a Los Angeles exhibition, writing, "Miss Gatch was represented by several new and striking prints. 'Spinning Song' (reproduced), being especially good, halation in this case being turned to good pictorial advantage." Another Camera Craft review said of her coastal images, " 'Driftwood' and 'Across the Dunes' are full of interest. The latter, which is reproduced, is perfect in composition and tone."

In 1903, she was an organizer of Salon Club of America, a group of amateur photographers who organized exhibitions nationally. She helped organize the Federation of American Photographic Societies in 1904.

Gatch won honorable mention in a 1905 Kodak competition, and "made her mark at the local, regional, and national levels with winning contest entries and acceptance of her work into salons at San Francisco and Philadelphia".

Her last known national exhibit was in 1907. She died in Oakland, California, on January 11, 1942.

== See also ==
- History of photography
- Fine-art photography
