= Pasar =

Pasar پاسار
- Village
- Location within Iran
- Coordinates: 34°14′08″N 47°22′54″E
- Country: Iran
- Province: Kermanshah
- County: Harsin
- Bakhsh: Central
- Rural District: Cheshmeh Kabud

Population (2006)
  - Total: 512
- Time zone: UTC+3:30 (IRST)
  - Summer (DST): UTC+4:30 (IRDT)

Pasar (Persian: پاسار, also Romanized as Pāsār and Pāssar) is a village in Cheshmeh Kabud Rural District, in the Central District of Harsin County, Kermanshah Province, Iran. At the 2006 census, its population was 512, in 113 families.

The early 3rd millennium BC flint production site of Pasar is located southwest of the village. The site was located By Mortensen and Smith during their regional survey in 1977.
