= Carkeek =

Carkeek is a surname. Notable people with the surname include:

- Arthur Carkeek (1843–1897), member of the Armed Constabulary in the New Zealand Wars
- Barlow Carkeek (1878–1937), Australian sportsman who played cricket and Australian rules football
- Guendolen Plestcheeff (1892–1994), Seattle, Washington preservationist and arts advocate; born Guendolen Carkeek
- Jack Carkeek (1861–1924), American Cornish champion wrestler from Rockland, Michigan United States
- Stephen Carkeek (1815–1878), New Zealand civil servant
- Vernon Carkeek (1893–1968), Australian footballer
- Vivian Carkeek (1879–1934), Seattle, Washington lawyer

== See also ==
- Carkeek Park, 216-acre (87.1 ha) park located in the Broadview neighborhood of Seattle, Washington
- Carkeek Observatory, earliest surviving astronomical observatory in New Zealand
