= Eugene McAllaster =

Eugene Loring McAllaster (April 20, 1866, January 30, 1961) was a distinguished Seattle, Washington, naval architect and engineer, he is most famous for designing the historic Seattle fireboat Duwamish. He was also a consulting engineer on Seattle's Denny Hill and Jackson Street regrades.

Eugene and Katherine McAllaster, 509 Belmont, Seattle, Washington, July 30, 1921, their 31st wedding anniversary photograph.

McAllaster graduated from the University of Michigan in 1889 and in 1890 he married Katherine F. Nichols. Kittie, as she was known by friends and family, was born in Michigan, on June 16, 1867, and spent her girlhood in Ann Arbor, Michigan.

The newlyweds lived in Detroit until their move to Seattle in 1894. McAllaster quickly established himself in the Seattle business community as a skilled naval architect and engineer. He became deeply involved with the Denny Hill Regrade and Jackson Street Regrade, and was an integral part of the successes of these massive undertakings.

With his business prospering he purchased a fine Capitol Hill home on March 2, 1902, at 509 Belmont, overlooking downtown Seattle, Puget Sound and the Olympic Mountains.

Seattle in the early 1900s, with its long waterfront of wooden docks, warehouses and merchant vessels, was a large responsibility for Seattle's fire department. It was feared that another devastating fire like the Great Seattle Fire of 1889 would overwhelm the capability of the city's single fireboat, the Snoqualmie.

In response to this concern, a new and more powerful fireboat was ordered in 1909. The city entrusted the important fireboat design responsibility to Mr. McAllaster.

McAllaster had arrived in Seattle five years after the Great Seattle Fire and anticipated the risks of another devastating fire. He designed the most powerful fireboat at the time, the fireboat Duwamish.

McAllaster died on January 30, 1961, and is buried next to his wife in Seattle's Lake View Cemetery, along with other Seattle notables.
