= United Confederate Veterans Memorial =

Confederate monument in Seattle, Washington, U.S.

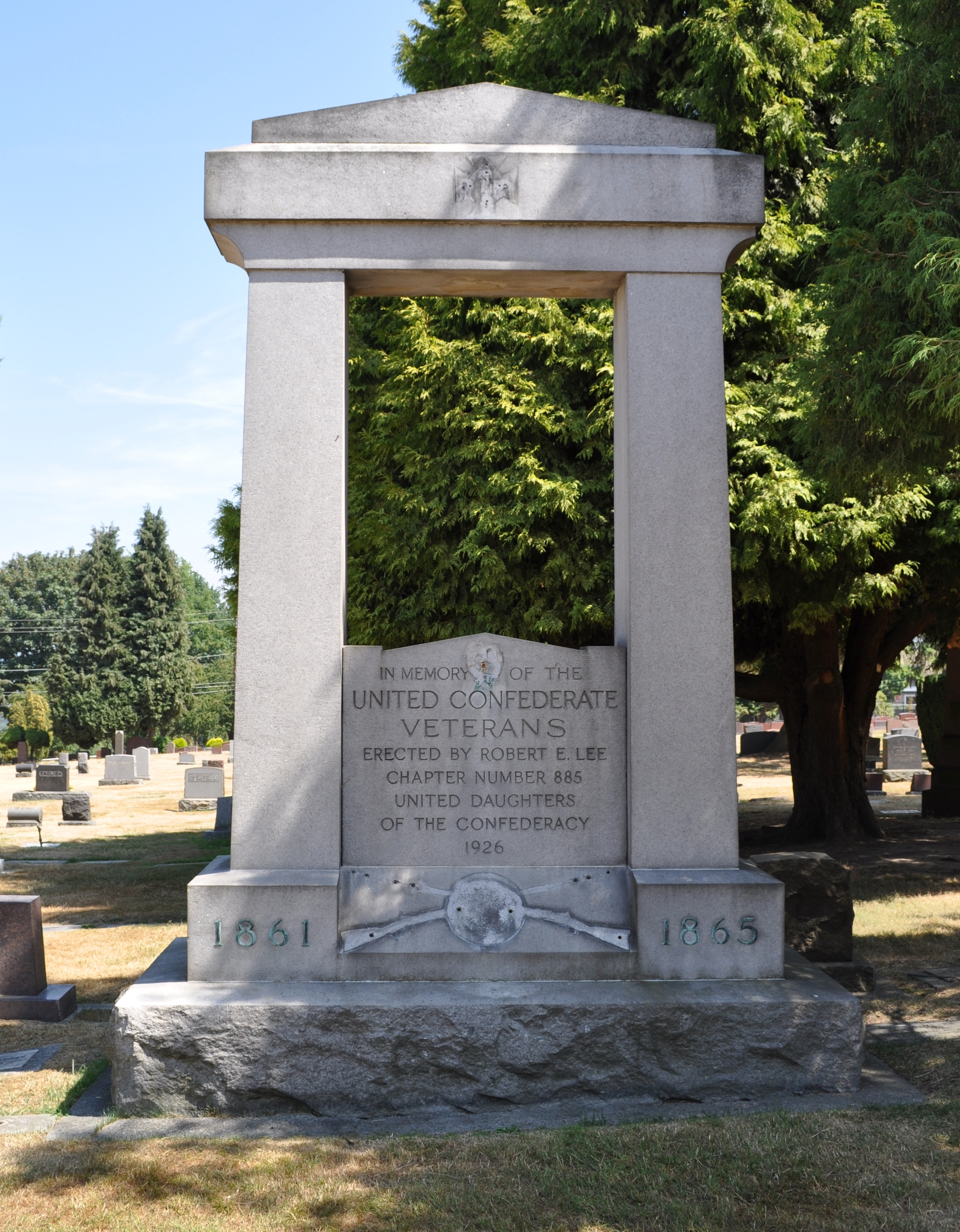
- Year: 1926 - July 4, 2020
- Medium: Granite sculpture
- Dimensions: 4.3 m (14 ft)
- Location: Seattle, Washington, U.S.
- 47.634329°N 122.314261°W
- Owner: Lake View Cemetery

The United Confederate Veterans Memorial was a Confederate monument in Seattle's privately owned Lake View Cemetery, in the U.S. state of Washington. The memorial was erected by the United Daughters of the Confederacy in 1926. It was constructed of quartz monzonite from Stone Mountain, the Georgia landmark and birthplace of the modern Ku Klux Klan.

== History ==
The 10-ton slab of granite used in Seattle's memorial was shipped to Seattle via the Panama Canal from Georgia's Stone Mountain by the United Daughters of the Confederacy in 1926. The President of the UDC Robert E. Lee Chapter #885 and Washington Division at the time, Mrs. May Avery Wilkins, who was originally from Georgia, is credited with establishing the monument. Her father, Col. Avery appears to have been a Commander in Chief of a Georgia county Ku Klux Klan in the late 19th century.

=== Vandalism and removal ===
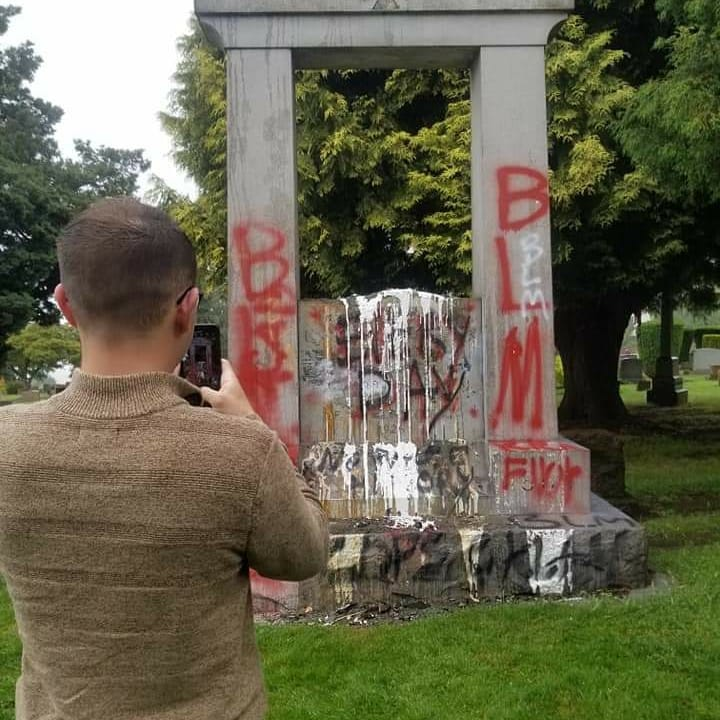
The memorial a month before being toppled by protestors. (June 2020)

The monument has been vandalized repeatedly. In 2005, "the flag insignia, bayonets, and a plaque with Robert E. Lee on it were stolen, but then restored". Following the Charleston church shooting of 2015, "Fuck White Supremacy" was painted on it. On July 5, 2018, "several parts of the 10-ton piece of granite [were] smashed, including a portion of the monument's inscription, insignia, and relief of Robert E. Lee."

In 2015, a petition was started to have it removed. In 2017, in response to the Unite the Right rally in Charlottesville and the increased pace of the removal of Confederate monuments and memorials in other parts of the country, Seattle Mayor Ed Murray said, "Seattle needs to join with cities and towns across the country who are sending a strong message by taking these archaic symbols down," acknowledging that Lake View is private property outside the city's control. Murray also called for the removal of the Statue of Lenin in Fremont, also on private property, prompting the Seattle City Council to consider debating a symbolic resolution asking for the removal of the two monuments.

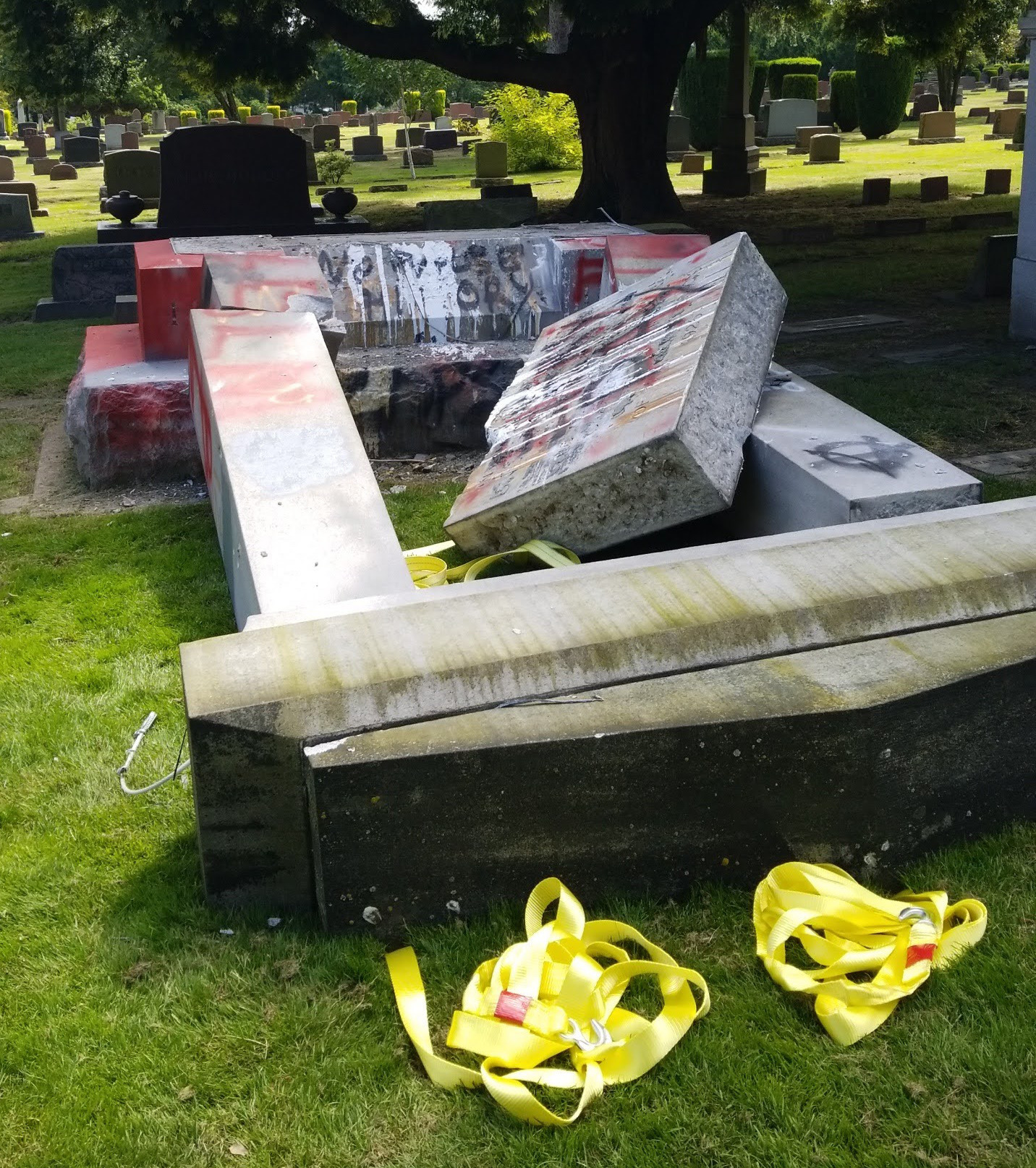
The memorial shown toppled on July 4, 2020

On March 19, 2018 Heidi Christensen, former and last acting President of the Seattle Chapter of the United Daughters of the Confederacy, the Veterans for Peace Seattle Chapter, and the NW Museum of Legends and Lore, spoke to Seattle City Council to request removal of the monument in Lakeview Cemetery. Christensen stated during her comments, "It is high time we retire these relics to private property. While I realize the Lakeview Cemetery is private property, it becomes a symbol for misguided minds."

It is on the Make It Right Project's 2018 list of the 10 Confederate monuments it most wants removed, noting that "It is located near 14 Confederate graves but there are no bodies below it, which means it is not a grave marker, but a propagandistic piece of the Lost Cause effort." In October 2018, the Project put up a billboard in Seattle, saying: "Hey Seattle, there's a Confederate Memorial in your backyard".

During the 2020 George Floyd protests, demonstrators demanded the removal of the monument.

The monument was toppled by "a group of local activists supportive of racial justice and the Black Lives Matter movement," apparently on July 3, 2020. In the process, the lower ends of both formerly vertical columns were broken in multiple places. The activists responsible wrote in a statement to the South Seattle Emerald that, "this action is for everyone, living or dead, who has been stolen, murdered, enslaved, raped, tortured, brutalized, terrorized, displaced, incarcerated, colonized, exploited, or separated from land, family, and culture by white supremacy. May the memory of those who have gone home be a blessing to us all, and may their descendants know the peace of true and everlasting justice." The wreckage was discovered by visitors to the cemetery on July 4.

Lake View Cemetery quietly removed the rubble of the monument by early September, 2020. There are no plans to restore or replace the monument, according to a statement given by the cemetery to the Capitol Hill Seattle community blog.

== See also ==
- 1926 in art
- Jefferson Davis Park, Washington
- List of Confederate monuments and memorials
- Removal of Confederate monuments and memorials
