= Flag of Washington =

U.S. state flag

State of Washington
- Use: Civil and state flag
- Proportion: 2:3, 3:5, or 5:8
- Adopted: March 5, 1923 (standardized in 1967)
- Design: A state seal sized at 1/3 the length of the flag centered on a field of dark green.

The flag of Washington consists of the state's seal, a portrait of George Washington, on a dark green field with optional gold fringe. It is the only U.S. state flag with a green field, as well as the only state flag with the likeness of a U.S. president. The secretary of state regulates flag protocol related to the state flag, as well as approving replica flags for commercial sale and other standards related to the flag.

Though Washington had achieved statehood in 1889, it did not have an official flag at the time. In 1915, the Washington chapter of the Daughters of the American Revolution designed a green flag with a centered state seal and campaigned for its adoption by the Washington State Legislature in the early 1920s. The flag was officially adopted on March 5, 1923, and has since undergone minor revisions, including the use of standardized colors in 1955 and a modernized seal in 1967.

== History ==
=== Background ===
Washington adopted its seal during the state constitutional convention on August 21, 1889, months prior to official admission as a U.S. state on November 11, 1889. While the new state did not have an official flag, a military flag displaying a gold profile of George Washington, the state's namesake, on blue bunting was used across the state at the turn of the 20th century and was first carried by the Washington Volunteer Infantry during the Philippine–American War in 1899. Another popular design was a purple or green flag bearing the state seal in gold.

In 1913, representative William J. Hughes of Whatcom County proposed the formation of a commission to adopt the state flag, consisting of the governor, secretary of state, and adjutant general. Governor Ernest Lister became a supporter of the idea, issuing a call for designs from the state's citizens and city organizations. The campaign for a state flag, however, was opposed by patriotic groups like the Sons of the American Revolution and Sons of Veterans, finding the use of a state flag to be detrimental to the national flag. Hughes' bill was passed 69–20 in the state House of Representatives, but did not make it to the floor in the state senate.

The Washington chapter of the Daughters of the American Revolution (DAR) began a campaign to adopt an official state flag during the Alaska–Yukon–Pacific Exposition of 1909, a world's fair hosted in Seattle. In 1914, the national DAR requested that the Washington chapter send a state flag to be displayed in the DAR Memorial Continental Hall in Washington, D.C. Upon discovering that the state lacked a suitable flag, the DAR formed a design committee, led by Emma Plummer Chadwick (wife of Washington Supreme Court justice Stephen J. Chadwick), to design a state flag. The DAR's flag, adopted in 1915, consisted of a green background with the state seal in the center. The flag was manufactured in Washington, D.C., at a cost of $48 (equivalent to $1,500 in 2025), and displayed by the national DAR until 1916. The flag was returned to the Washington chapter for their April 1916 general meeting in Everett, where DAR State Regent Angie Elizabeth Burt Bowden called on the chapter to ask the legislature to accept the flag as an official state symbol.

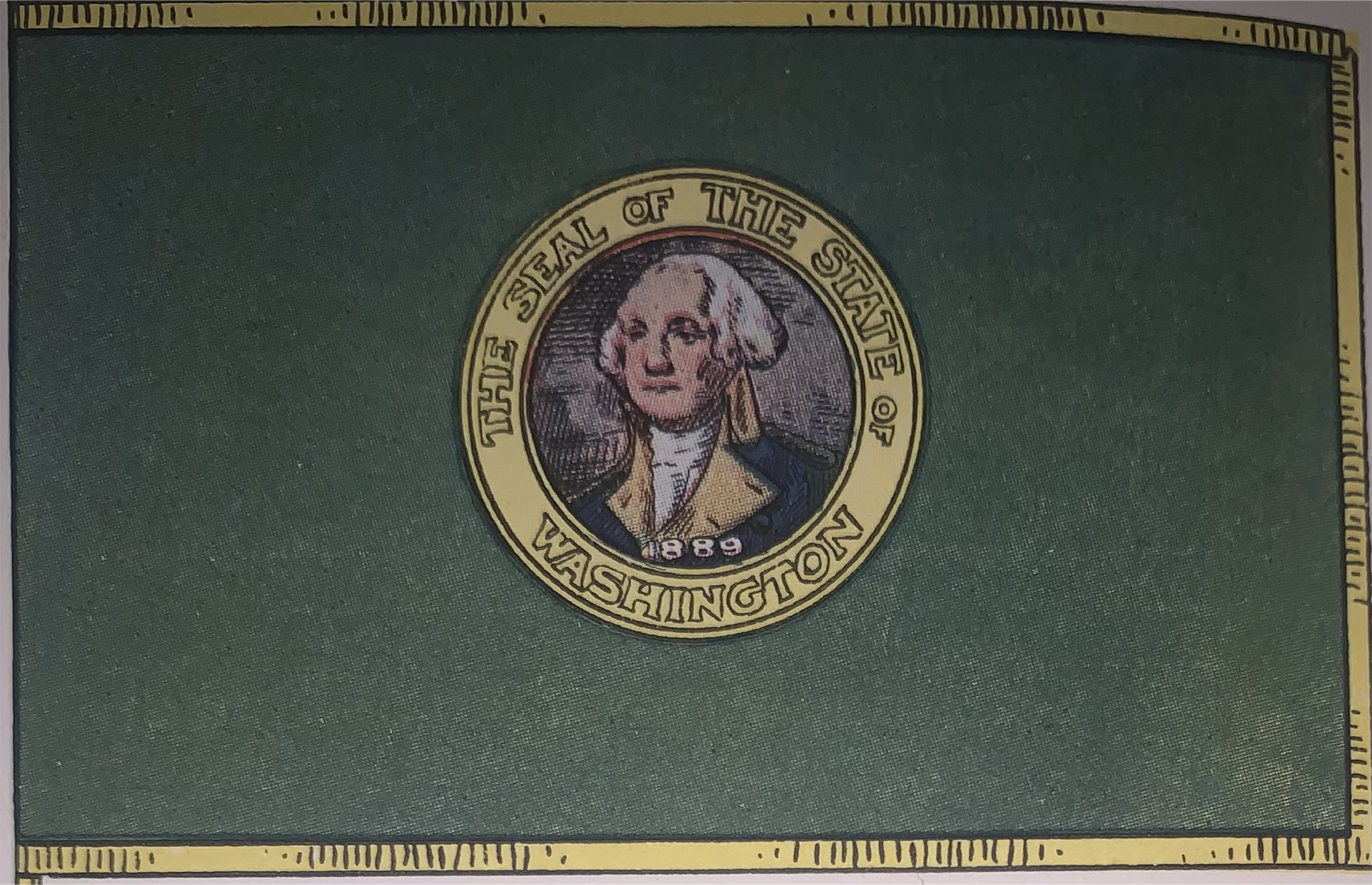
The flag carried by the state's National Guard in 1917

A 1917 issue of National Geographic Magazine on U.S. state flags featured an unofficial flag of Washington similar to the DAR's design, a green background and the state seal in gold, sourced from "military authorities". Another major flag proposal emerged in 1920 from the short-lived Washington State Nautical School, where secretary-treasurer Grover C. Gaier designed a green flag with the state seal and fringe in gold. The flag would fly aboard the USS Vicksburg, representing the state nautical school during a voyage along the West Coast and to Hawaii.

=== Adoption and modifications ===
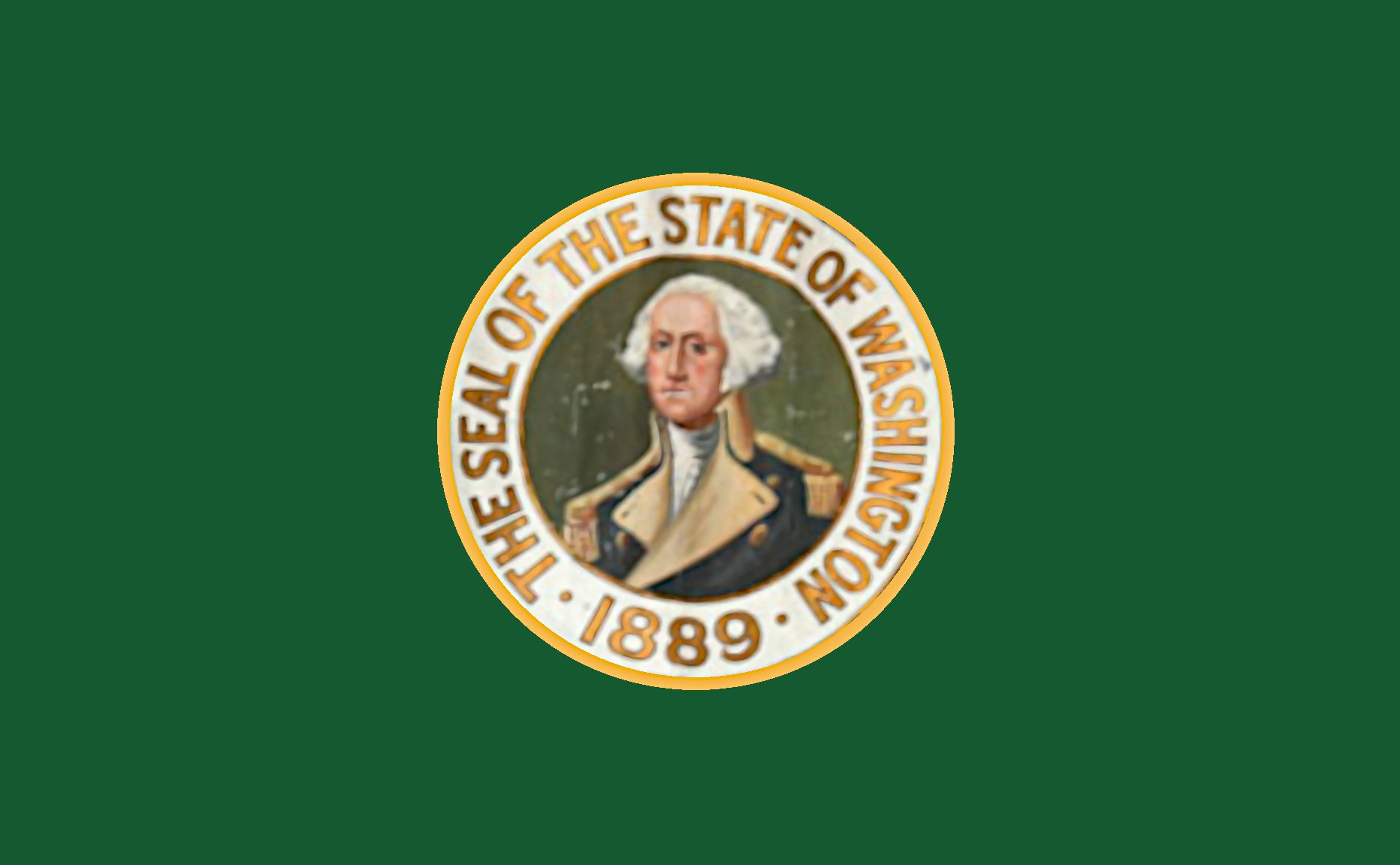
Flag of Washington prior to the 1967 adoption of a new seal and standardization

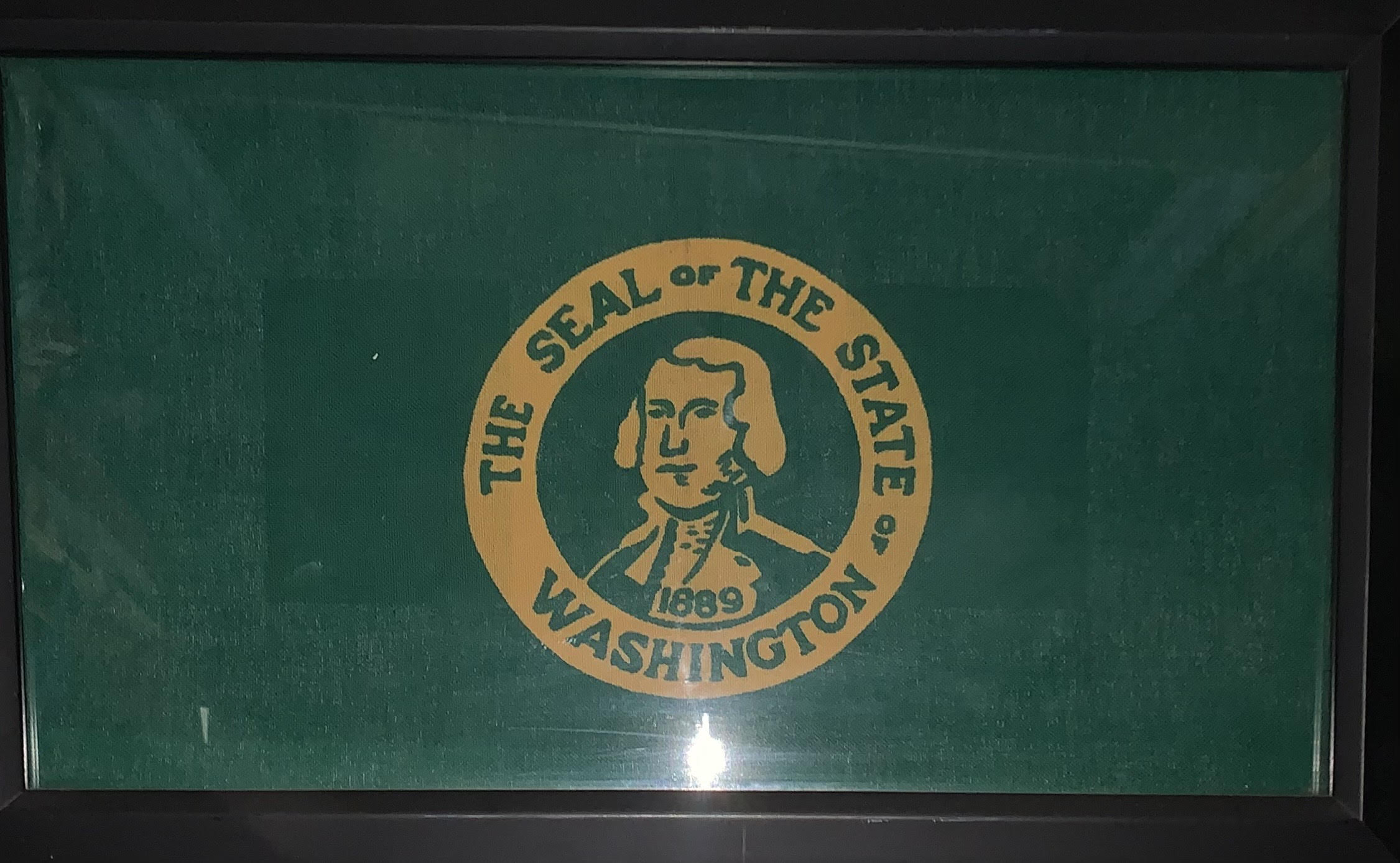
An early state flag with an all gold seal

The DAR renewed its lobbying for a state flag in 1922, having gained the approval of the Sons of the American Revolution and other civic organizations. A bill adopting the state flag was introduced in the 1923 legislative session and passed unanimously in the Senate by February, and the House of Representatives on March 5, 1923. The governor's approval was not required and the bill became law, formally adopting the state flag. The law took effect on June 7, 1923, and an unofficial flag was unfurled on Flag Day by the DAR. At the time of its adoption, Washington was one of four states lacking an official state flag. The first official state flag, manufactured by Willis Bloom of the secretary of state's office, was unveiled on July 23, 1924. The new flag was celebrated with a "State Flag Waltz" performed at the Inaugural Ball on January 15, 1925, following the inauguration of Governor Roland H. Hartley.

During the 1925–26 session, the state legislature approved a change to the state flag that replaced the green fringe with a gold to match the state seal. The gold-fringed flag made its official debut on June 27, 1927, flying on the official automobile of the governor during a tour of Fort Lewis. In 1929, the DAR presented a state flag to Governor Hartley, who received it on behalf of the state for display in the Washington State Capitol.

The Washington Secretary of State issued standardized colors for the state flag in 1955, including the modern colors used in the state seal. The state seal itself was redesigned by Dick Nelms at the request of the secretary of state in 1967, using Gilbert Stuart's famous portrait painting of George Washington. The new state seal was approved by the state legislature in April 1967, placing it on the updated state flag with immediate effect.

=== Criticism and proposed redesigns ===
A proposed design for the state flag submitted by Terrence A. Geiger to the Santa Barbara Museum of Art in 1976.

As part of the United States Bicentennial in 1976, the Santa Barbara Museum of Art held a nationwide contest for new flags for American states, cities, and other entities. A panel of judges selected 25 of the best designs to be displayed at various exhibitions around the United States, including at the Museum of Modern Art in New York City. Among the selected designs was a proposed flag for Washington, designed by Seattle designer Terrence A. Geiger, that featured green and yellow triangles in a repeated pattern.

In 2001, the North American Vexillological Association surveyed its members and other flag enthusiasts on the designs of the 72 U.S. state, U.S. territorial, and Canadian provincial flags. Members ranked the Washington state flag 47th out of the 72 flags surveyed, with a score of 4.53 points out of 10. Washington's flag was criticized for its complicated seal, use of lettering, and similarities to other U.S. state flags that used seals on solid colors.

A bill to form a redesign committee to produce a new state flag was proposed by a state legislator in 2025. The committee would include a bipartisan set of lawmakers, the Washington Secretary of State, the director of the Washington Arts Commission, historians, cultural leaders, tribal members, and citizens. A new design would be recommended by July 1, 2028 and require a referendum to be officially adopted as the state flag. The bill is in response to a wave of state flag redesigns that had been adopted or proposed in the 2020s.

== Design and specifications ==
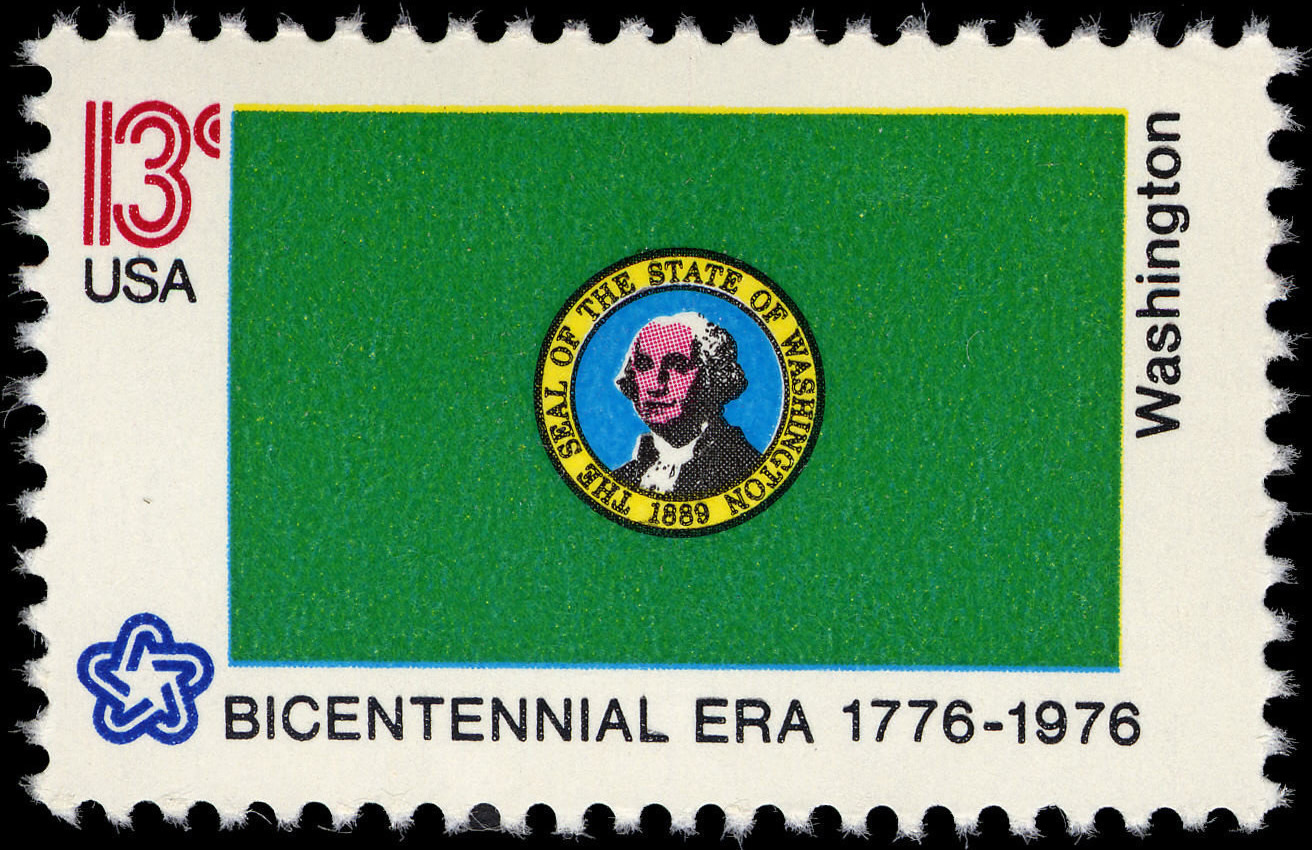
The Washington state flag as depicted in the 1976 bicentennial postage stamp series.

The flag of Washington consists of a dark green field with the seal of Washington, a portrait of George Washington inside a ring with the words "The Seal of the State of Washington 1889", in the center. The flag may also have an optional gold fringe. It is the only U.S. state flag to feature a green background, as well as the only one to feature the likeness of an identifiable historic person.

The Revised Code of Washington defines the state flag shall be of:

...dark green silk or bunting and shall bear in its center a reproduction of the seal of the state of Washington embroidered, printed, painted or stamped thereon. The edges of the flag may, or may not, be fringed. If a fringe is used the same shall be of gold or yellow color of the same shade as the seal. The dimensions of the flag may vary.

The flag has an aspect ratio of 1:1.6 (equivalent to 5:8), with the exception of two alternate flag sizes: 3 ft × 5 ft (0.9 m × 1.5 m) and 4 ft × 6 ft (1.2 m × 1.8 m). The size of the seal is proportional to the length of the flag, with a ratio of 1:3 between the seal diameter and length of the flag. On a 5 ft × 8 ft (1.5 m × 2.4 m) flag, the seal has a diameter of 31 in (78.7 cm).

=== Colors ===
The flag's colors follow both the Standard Color Reference of America, and the Pantone Matching System.

According to Senator Guy B. Groff, sponsor of the 1923 bill that adopted the flag, the flag's green field represented the "verdant fields" of Western Washington, while the gold seal represented the "wheat areas" of Eastern Washington.

Washington state flag colors
Use(s)	Color	Pantone (CMYK printing)	Textile color	RGB values	Hex
Background	Irish Green	PMS 348	80210	0-132-61	#00843D
State Seal (border); Fringe	Spanish Yellow	PMS 116	80068	255-205-0	#FFCD00
State Seal (interior)	Oriental Blue	PMS 311	—N/a	5-195-222	#05C3DE
State Seal (portrait, lettering, rings)	Black	PMS Process Black	—N/a	0-0-0	#000000
George Washington's face	Eggshell	PMS 169	80004	255-179-171	#FFB3AB

== Usage and protocol ==
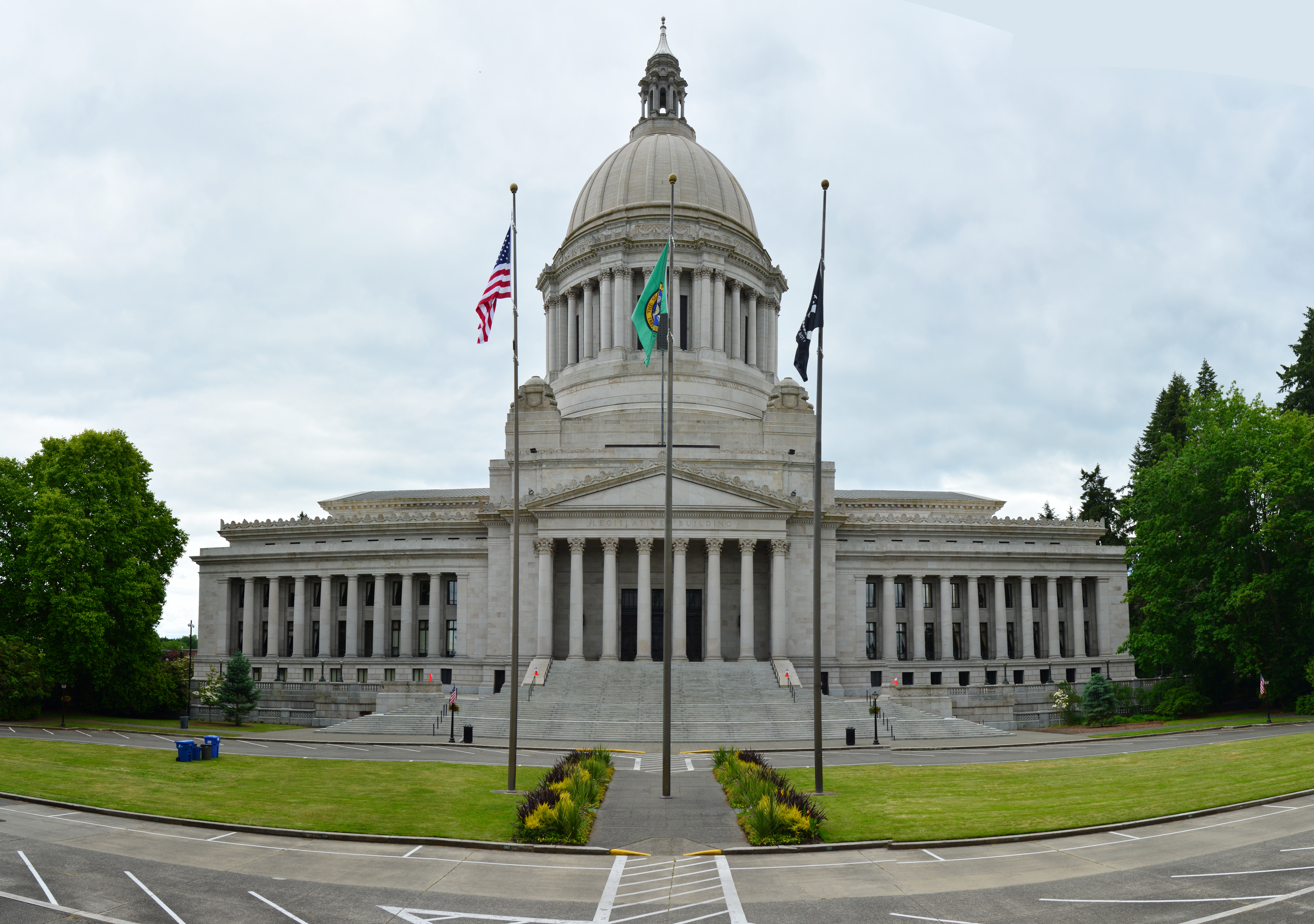
The state flag (center) flying at the Washington State Capitol in Olympia, Washington

The Washington Secretary of State regulates flag protocol as well as the distribution and sale of the state flag. Replica flags made for commercial sale are required to be approved by the secretary of state. The state seal on the flag must be stitched on both sides with the profile of George Washington facing the same direction, making the Washington state flag among the most expensive U.S. state flags to manufacture.

When flown within the state of Washington, the state flag occupies the highest position of honor after the U.S. flag and the flags of foreign sovereign states. When flown alongside other U.S. state flags, the Washington state flag is placed 42nd, the order in which it ratified the U.S. Constitution and became a state. A section of the Revised Code of Washington also requires that the state flag and the U.S. flag "shall be prominently installed, displayed and maintained in schools, court rooms and state buildings." The state flag and U.S. flag are also required to be prominently displayed by code cities and displayed on certain holidays by all cities, towns, and counties.

The lowering of the state and U.S. flags to half-mast is left at the discretion of local entities, but may be ordered by the Governor of Washington during the observance of memorial days, as well as in the event of the death of prominent government officials, state employees, public safety servants in the line of duty, and members of the United States Armed Forces from Washington.
