= Seal of Washington =

Official government emblem of the U.S. state of Washington

Seal of the State of Washington
- Armiger: State of Washington
- Adopted: 1889
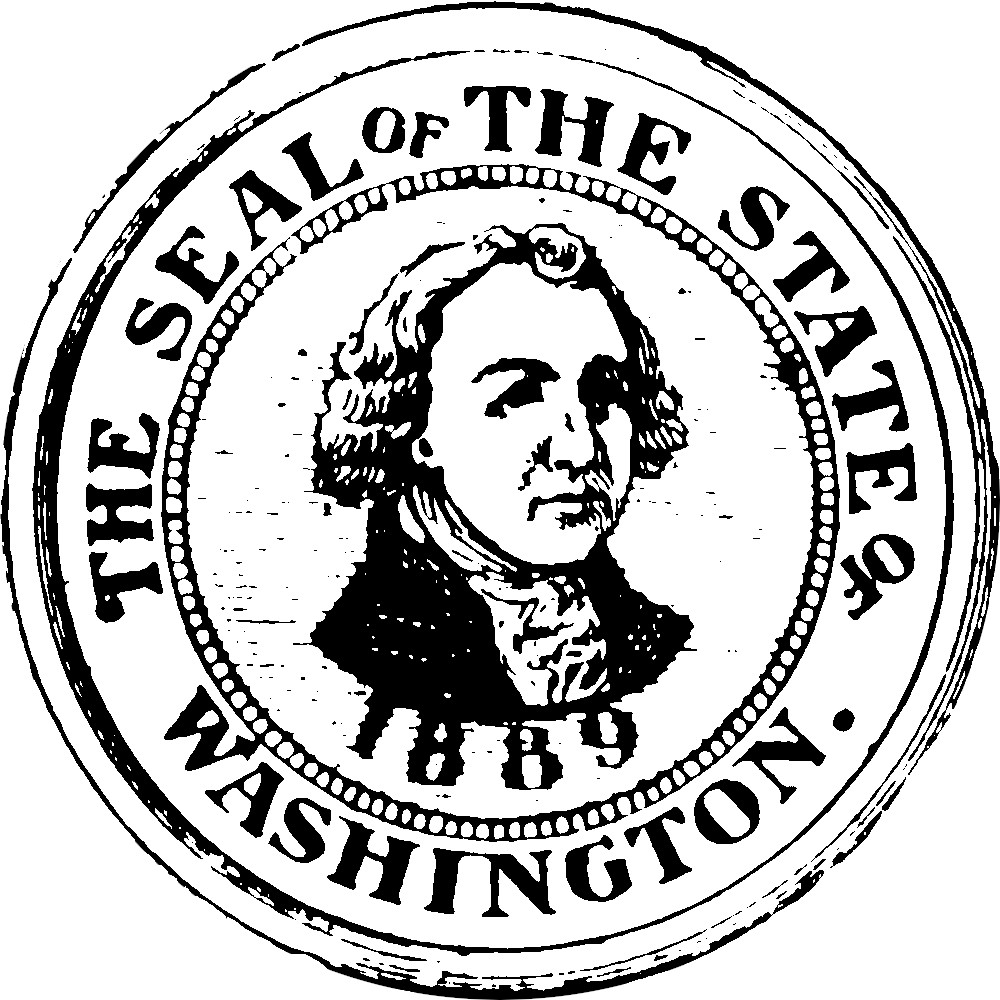
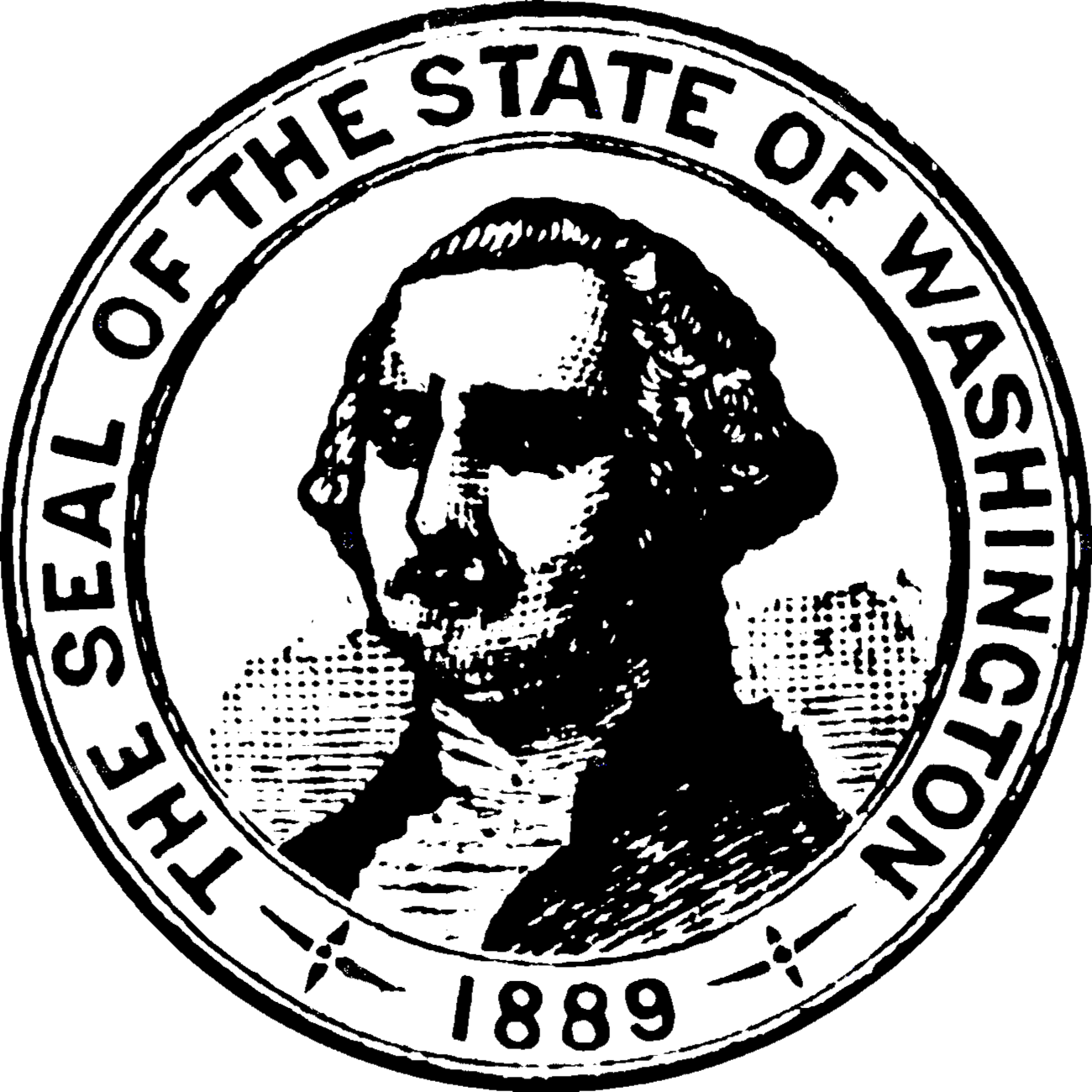
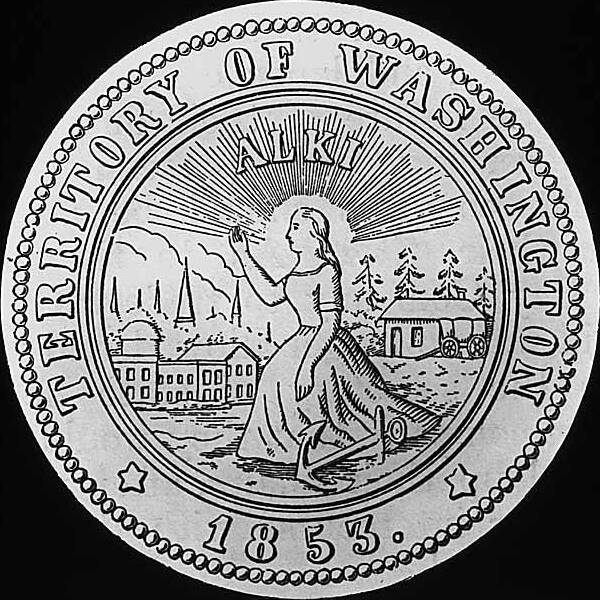
- Earlier version(s)

The seal of the state of Washington contains a portrait of George Washington, the first president of the United States, as painted by Gilbert Stuart. The outer ring contains the text "The Seal of the State of Washington" and "1889", the year Washington was admitted to the Union. The seal is featured as the main element on both sides of the flag of Washington.

== History ==
=== Territorial seal ===
Johnson K. Duncan designed the Washington territorial seal in the 1850s when he was a U.S. Army lieutenant on Governor Isaac Stevens' surveying expedition. On one side it depicts a log cabin in forest and on the other side, a city in the background with the Goddess of Hope and an anchor depicted in the center. The goddess points at the word "Alki" (Al-ki or Alki), which is a Chinook Jargon word meaning "bye and bye", which is now the state motto of Washington. This now-defunct territorial seal marks the first usage of the phrase in a context of a Washingtonian motto.

=== State seal ===
The seal was designed by Olympian jeweler Charles R. Talcott, based on a painting by Gilbert Stuart. Originally the seal was to be a scene featuring Mount Rainier, but Talcott proposed the design featuring George Washington instead.

== Seal of the lieutenant governor ==
There is also a seal of the lieutenant governor of Washington, created in 1959. The seal was created to mirror aspects of regional interest that embody the traditions and culture of Washington state. The seal is represented by the official state symbols of the willow goldfinch, chosen in 1951 by a run-off between the meadowlark and the goldfinch; the coast rhododendron, voted in by Washington women prior to universal suffrage in 1892; and the twin gavels of the state legislature, representing the bipartisan spirit of lawmaking, all enclosed in a circle. At the center is the state capitol building in Olympia, one of the tallest masonry domes in the world. Two western hemlocks, the state tree since 1947, flank the seal's outer edges.

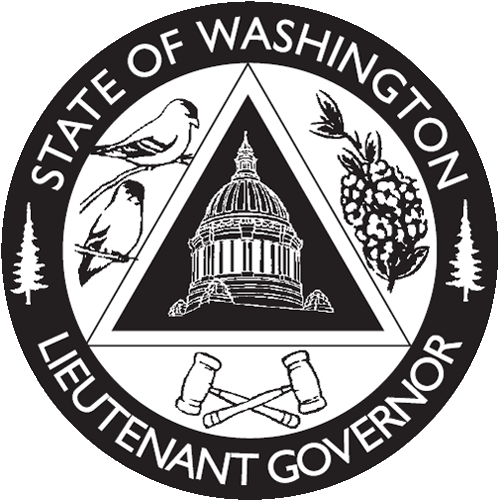
Seal of the Lieutenant Governor of Washington
