= Sam Hill House (Seattle) =

- U.S. National Register of Historic Places
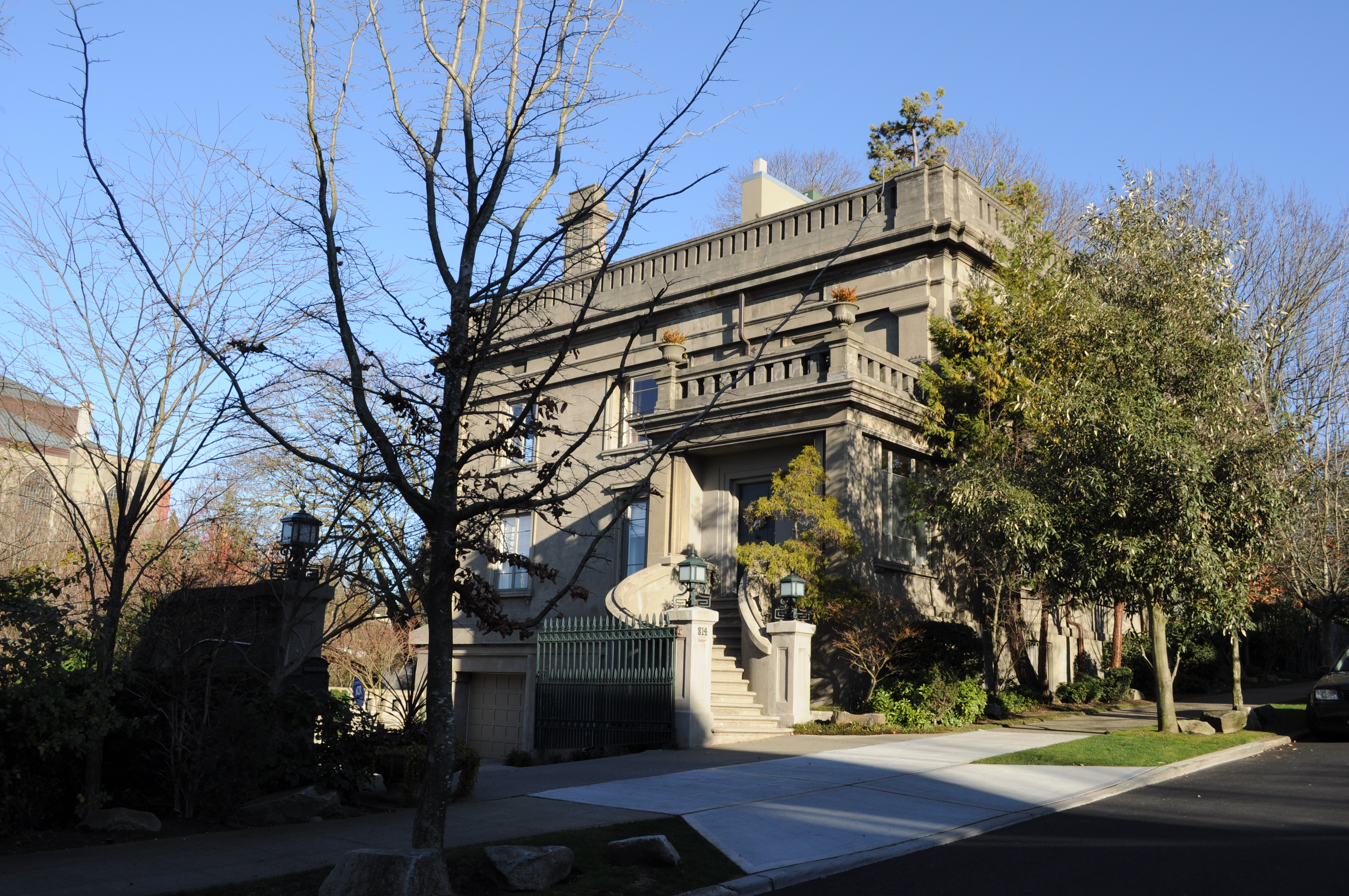
- Sam Hill House pictured in 2009.

- Location within Washington (state)
- Location: 814 E. Highland Dr, Seattle, Washington
- Coordinates: 47.63065°N 122.32152°W
- Built: 1909-1910
- Architect: Hornblower & Marshall
- Architectural style: Classical Revival
- NRHP reference No.: 76001887
- Added to NRHP: May 3, 1976

Sam Hill House is a historic, privately owned home located in Seattle, Washington's Capitol Hill neighborhood. The property forms part of the city-designated Harvard-Belmont Landmark District.

The concrete building was constructed between 1909 and 1910 by railroad magnate Sam Hill in preparation for a planned visit to Seattle by a member of the Belgian royal family.

== History ==
=== Early Years and Plestcheeff Era (1909–1994) ===
Samuel Hill commissioned the Washington, D.C. architects Hornblower & Marshall to design the house, which was completed in 1910 in a Classical Revival style. The residence featured imposing concrete facades and formal terraces reminiscent of European chateaux.

After Hill’s death in 1931, the mansion stood empty for six years. In 1937 it was acquired by Guendolen Plestcheeff, a Seattle society figure and preservation advocate, and her husband Theodoreen. Plestcheeff modernized portions of the interior but retained the home’s historic character. In 1987 there was established the Plestcheeff Institute of Decorative Arts on the premises. Plestcheeff resided in the mansion until her death in 1994.

=== Renovation and Modern Use (2000s–present) ===
In the early 2000s, Sam Hill House underwent renovation lasting approximately eight years.

The project was a collaboration between Garret Cord Werner Architects & Interior Designers and Stuart Silk Architects.

Garret Cord Werner’s key alterations included exposing the structural steel beams in the dining room to highlight the building’s industrial-era construction, alongside subtly integrating energy-efficient lighting and insulation within the restored historic millwork. Landscape modifications reorganized the outdoor spaces to create a unified spatial relationship between the mansion’s interiors and its grounds.

Prioritized retaining original structural elements, including steel beams, fireplaces, and gas-lit exterior lamps, while introducing modern systems such as climate control and seismic retrofitting. The property’s former horse stable was transformed into a recreational space housing a gym, spa, steam shower, and sauna.

After the renovation, the mansion returned to private use. In 2016 it was put on the market, and in 2018 it sold to tech investor Boris Nikolic (a former advisor to Bill Gates) and entrepreneur Samir Jaradeh. The sale and the home’s assessed value (as a historic property) became part of a local discussion on tax breaks for restored landmarks. In 2022, the Sam Hill House was listed for sale again; the listing drew media attention due to Nikolic’s brief and controversial role as executor of Jeffrey Epstein’s estate.

== Architecture and Design ==
The 11,000-square-foot mansion includes five stories, steel beams, and a concrete-block construction that provided early 20th-century fireproofing and thermal efficiency. Original details included hardwood floors, gas-lit exterior lamps, and a secret passageway connecting the master suite to other rooms. A historic sundial, Seattle’s oldest, remains on the grounds.

== Cultural and Historical Significance ==
The house was added to the National Register of Historic Places in 1976 and is part of the Harvard-Belmont Landmark District. Sam Hill’s regional legacy includes the Peace Arch in Blaine, Washington, and Maryhill Museum of Art.

== See also ==
- Sam Hill
- Maryhill Museum of Art
- Maryhill Stonehenge
- Colonial Revival architecture
- National Register of Historic Places listings in Seattle
