= Lake View Cemetery (Seattle) =

Cemetery in Seattle, Washington, U.S.

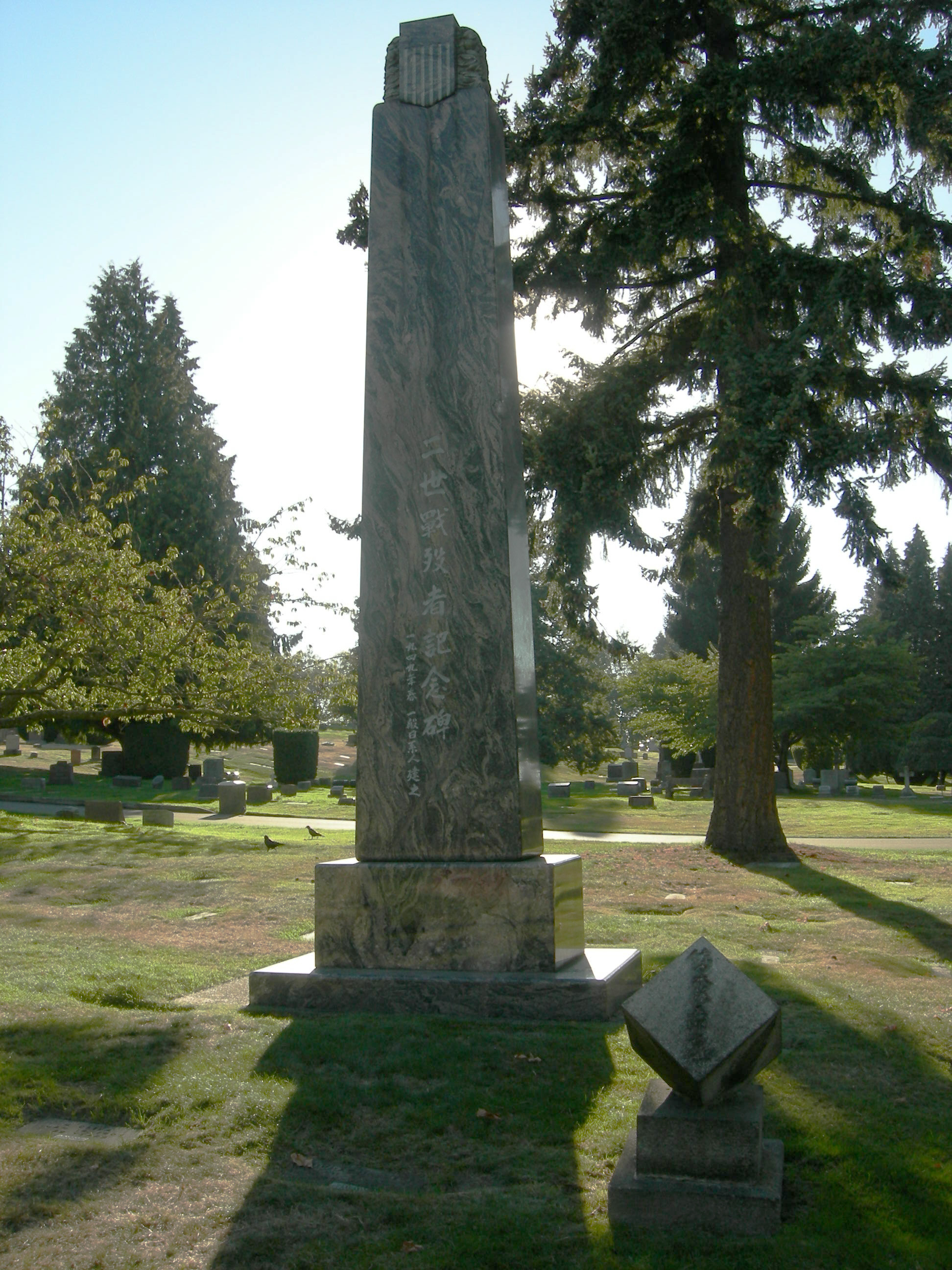
- Nisei War Memorial, Lake View Cemetery
- Interactive map of Lake View Cemetery

Details
- Established: 1872
- Location: Seattle, Washington
- Country: US
- Coordinates: 47°38′02″N 122°18′55″W
- Type: Private, non-profit
- Owned by: Lake View Cemetery Association
- Size: 40 acres (16 ha)
- No. of graves: 40,000

Lake View Cemetery is a private cemetery located in Seattle, Washington, in the Capitol Hill neighborhood, just north of Volunteer Park. Known as "Seattle's Pioneer Cemetery," it is run by an independent, non-profit association. The cemetery was founded in 1872 by St. John's Lodge No. 9, Seattle's oldest Masonic lodge, on land acquired from Seattle pioneer Doc Maynard. Later renamed for its view of Lake Washington to the east.

== Interments ==
- Princess Angeline – daughter of Chief Seattle
- Walter B. Beals – Chief Justice Washington State Supreme Court. Presiding Judge, Nuremberg War Crimes Trials, 1946–1947.
- Angie Elizabeth Burt Bowden, Washington State Regent, Daughters of the American Revolution
- Beriah Brown – Mayor of Seattle
- Libbie Beach Brown – philanthropist and temperance activist
- Gottlieb Burian – Founder of the city of Burien, Washington
- Emma Plummer Chadwick – Head of the Order of the Eastern Star
- Denny Party members (Seattle pioneers), including:
  - Carson Boren
  - Arthur A. Denny
  - George Frye
  - David Swinson "Doc" Maynard
  - Thomas Mercer
- Tudor Ganea – mathematician
- Jesse Glover – martial artist and first student of Bruce Lee
- William Grose – second black resident of Seattle
- Granville O. Haller – businessman and military officer
- Thaddeus Hanford – Seattle newspaper editor
- Jeff Heath – Major League Baseball player
- Horace Chapin Henry – Seattle businessperson, philanthropist, and art collector
- Don A. Jones – Rear admiral in the National Oceanic and Atmospheric Administration Commissioned Officer Corps, final director of the United States Coast and Geodetic Survey, and first director of the National Ocean Service
- John Leary – Seattle pioneer, mayor, civil leader

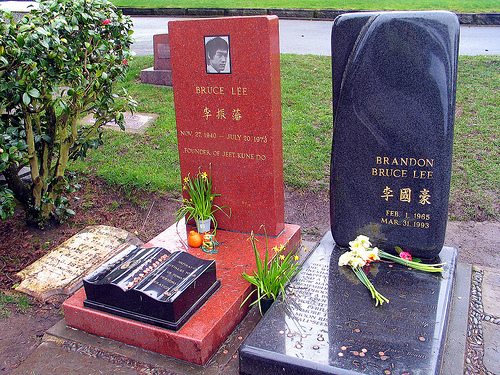
Graves of Bruce and Brandon Lee

- Bruce Lee – martial artist and actor
- Brandon Lee – martial artist, actor, and son of Bruce Lee
  - The Lees' gravesites are a tourist attraction visited by thousands of people a year. It is considered one of Seattle's most famous gravesites, was listed as one of the top 10 celebrity graves in the world by Time, and is found in several Seattle travel guidebooks. In 2013, forty years after his death, on Bruce Lee's birthday, flowers were piled as high as the headstones. Lake View Cemetery did not allow Kurt Cobain to be buried there because of the already-large numbers of visitors to the Lees' graves.
- Denise Levertov – poet
- William Harvey Lillard – first chiropractic patient
- Eugene McAllaster – naval architect; designer of the fireboat Duwamish
- John W. Nordstrom – founder of Nordstrom department store
- Guy Carleton Phinney – developer whose land became the Woodland Park
- A. W. Piper – pioneer, baker, socialist Seattle City Council member, eponym of Pipers Creek and Piper Orchard
- Guendolen Plestcheeff – philanthropist and preservationist
- Steve Pool – American weather presenter and journalist
- Captain William Renton – prominent Seattle businessman and namesake of Renton, Washington
- John Saxon – actor and martial artist
- Edmund A. Smith – inventor
- John Tester – Wisconsin state legislator
- George Tsutakawa – Painter and sculptor, Northwest School
- Cordelia Wilson – American Southwest painter
- Amy Yee – Seattle tennis champion
- Henry Yesler – Seattle's first economic father and first millionaire

== Monuments ==
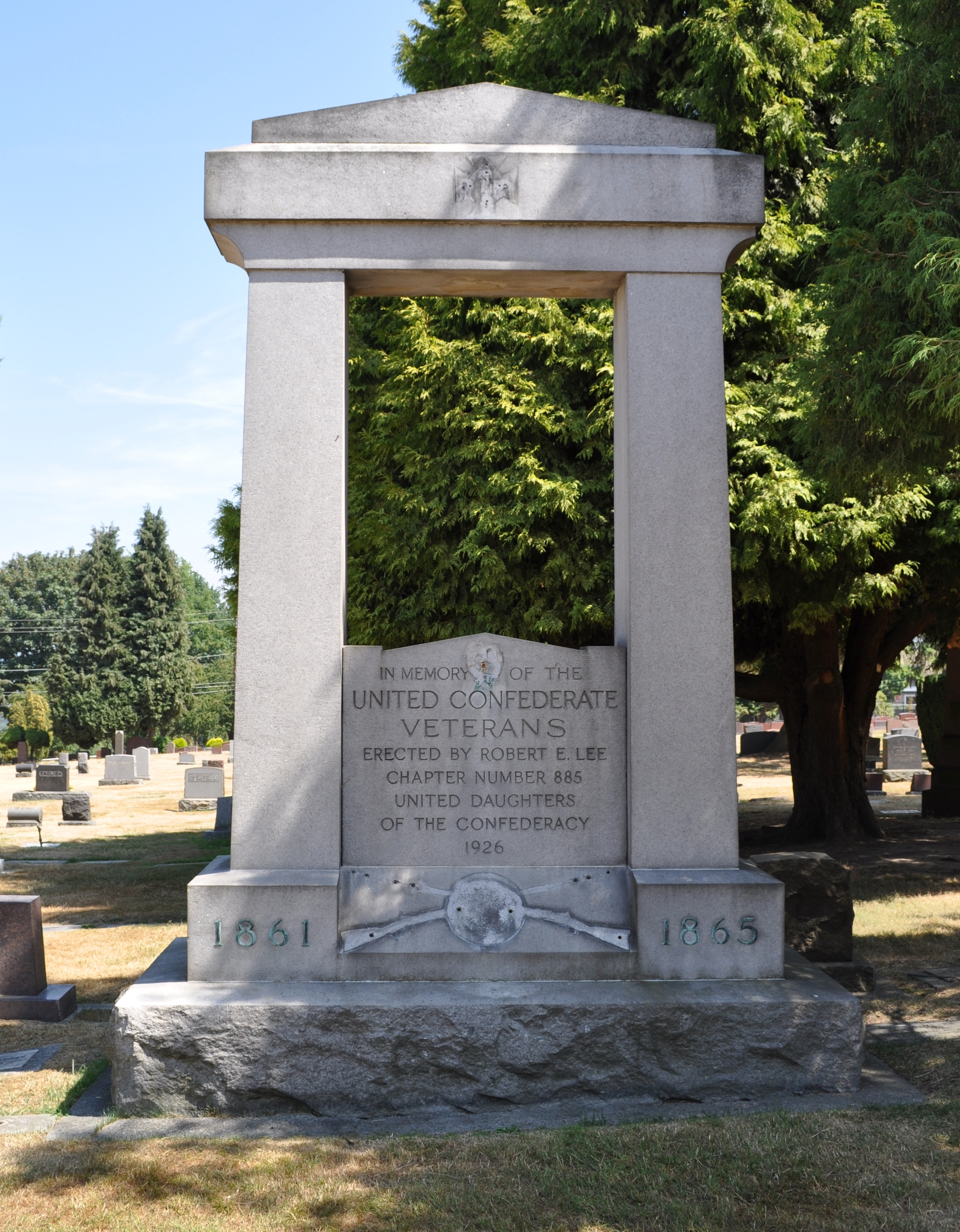
United Confederate Veterans Memorial (1926-2020)

Lake View includes the Nisei War Memorial Monument, a 21-foot column erected in 1949, listing the names of 47 Japanese American soldiers from Seattle who were killed during World War II. The Nisei Veterans Committee, in response to the US Army's plans in late 1947 to return Washington's Nisei war dead, began a door-to-door fundraising campaign in the Puget Sound region, collecting donations of $1 to $5, and raising over $10,000 to construct the memorial. Later, 9 more names of Seattle area service members of Japanese ancestry killed in Korea, Vietnam and Granada were added to names on the memorial.

The cemetery used to hold the United Confederate Veterans Memorial, which was erected in 1926 by Seattle's chapter of the United Daughters of the Confederacy as part of the Lost Cause movement. It used marble from Stone Mountain, Georgia, where the modern Ku Klux Klan had been founded. The memorial was erected near the site of 11 graves, the only burial ground in the Northwest of Confederate soldiers. Protestors and city officials had called for its removal for years, but the cemetery is private property and refused removal. In 2018, part of the facade was smashed, and it faced repeated vandalism. During the 2020 George Floyd protests, the memorial was toppled by unknown persons on July 3, 2020. The rubble was later cleared. As of September 2020, the cemetery had no plans to restore the monument.

== See also ==
- Grand Army of the Republic Cemetery (Seattle)
