= Edmund A. Smith =

American inventor (1870–1909)

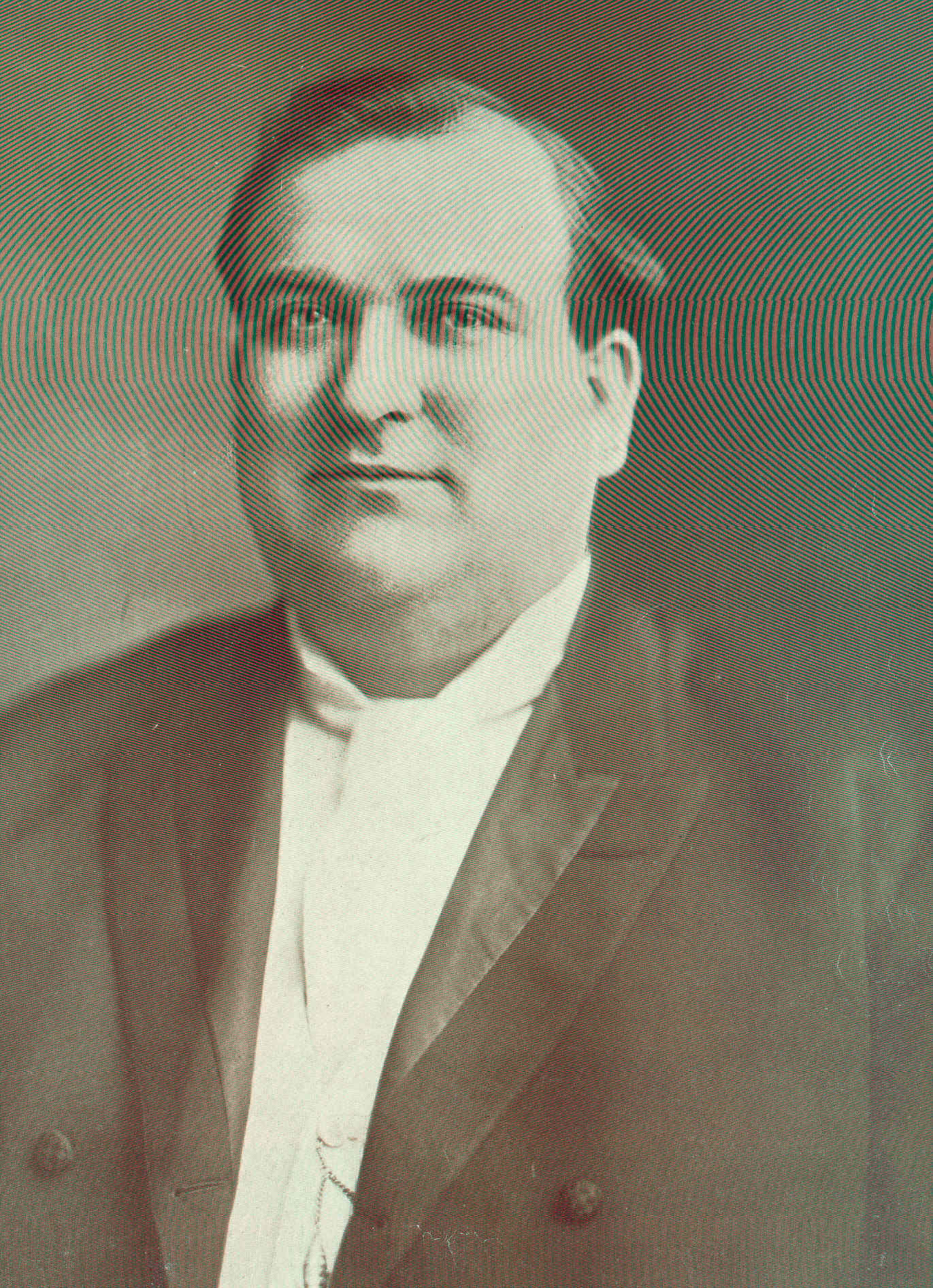
- Photograph of Smith, circa 1908
- Born: Edmund Augustine Smith; March 17, 1870; Ontario, Canada
- Died: June 3, 1909 (aged 39); Seattle, Washington, U.S.
- Burial place: Lake View Cemetery; Seattle, Washington, U.S.

Edmund Augustine "Ned" Smith (March 17, 1870 – June 3, 1909) was an American entrepreneur and inventor who helped to industrialize the fish packing and canning industry.

== Early life ==
Smith was born in 1870 in Middlesex County, Ontario, the son of Robert Frederick Smith (1832–1916) and Mary Charlotte Garnett Smith (1845–1899) By 1895, Smith had moved to Seattle, Washington.

== Career ==
Smith was an investor in various fish canning and brick-making businesses in the Seattle area. He owned the Smith Manufacturing Company, a waterfront workshop in the city where he developed and manufactured various inventions.

In 1903, Smith invention a mechanized fish-butchering machine which he named the Iron Chink, which gutted and cleaned salmon for canning at a rate of 55 times faster than human butchers. Smith obtained a U.S. patent for the machine in 1905 and a patent in Canada the following year. Other patented inventions of Smith's included a weight testing machine and composite pile.

The naming of the machine is an example of the anti-Chinese racism that was widespread in the American West during the mid-19th to early 20th centuries.

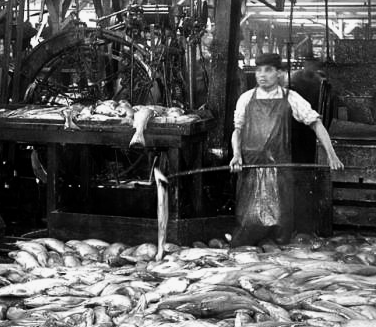
Smith's Iron Chink machine, pictured alongside a Chinese fishplant worker, was marketed as a replacement for fish-butchers, who were primarily Chinese immigrants

Smith's invention severely impacted the workers of the seafood industry, forcing thousands of seafood butchers and packers to find other sources of employment. However, Smith's invention increased cannery profits and led to the growth of the seafood industry.

Smith's invention gave him considerable wealth. Smith was invited to display his invention at the Alaska–Yukon–Pacific Exposition in 1909.

== Personal life and death ==
Smith married Wisconsin native Mary Gertrude Peterson in 1898. They had two children, Helen (b. 1899) and Wallace (b. 1902).

In June 1909 at the age of 39, Smith died in an automobile accident on his way to the opening of the Alaska–Yukon–Pacific Exposition. He is buried at Lake View Cemetery in Seattle.

== Legacy ==
An exhibit about Smith, including his "Iron Chink" invention, is displayed at the Museum of History & Industry.

Smith's invention is still used today, now known as the "Iron Butcher." His invention is regarded as an influential contribution to the growth of the warehousing, shipping, packing, and other cannery activities of the modern seafood industry, especially the salmon canning industry.
