= Angie Elizabeth Burt Bowden =

American clubwoman

- Bowden in 1915

Washington State Regent, Daughters of the American Revolution
- In office 1915 – November 29, 1917

Personal details
- Born: May 6, 1862 San Francisco, California, U.S.
- Died: 1952 (aged 89–90) Seattle, Washington, U.S.
- Resting place: Lake View Cemetery
- Spouse: Edmund Bowden
- Occupation: writer

Angie Elizabeth Burt Bowden (1860 – 1952) was an American clubwoman, writer, and pioneer. She served as the Washington State Regent of the Daughters of the American Revolution, during which time she helped establish the official Flag of Washington.

== Career and civic activities ==
Bowden was a writer and authored the book Early Schools of Washington Territory in 1935 and wrote about the career of John Paul Judson, the Territorial Librarian of Washington.

She was a member of the Rainier Chapter of the Daughters of the American Revolution (DAR) in Seattle, Washington. In 1931, she was selected as one of four women from the chapter to attend the DAR's convention in Spokane, Washington.

In April 1916, as Washington DAR State Regent, Bowden advocated for the Washington State Legislature to adopt a design by a DAR committee, led by Emma Plummer Chadwick, as the official state flag. In October 1916, as state regent, she unveiled historical markers commemorating pioneers and served as chairwoman of multiple celebratory ceremonies.

== Personal life and death ==
Bowden was born on May 6, 1862, in San Francisco. She was a Washington pioneer and lived in Walla Walla from 1866 to 1882.

She died in 1952 and was buried at Lake View Cemetery in Seattle. A pair of white leather high button shoes that she purchased circa 1917 from Turrell's are in the collection of the Museum of History & Industry.
