= Carkeek Observatory =

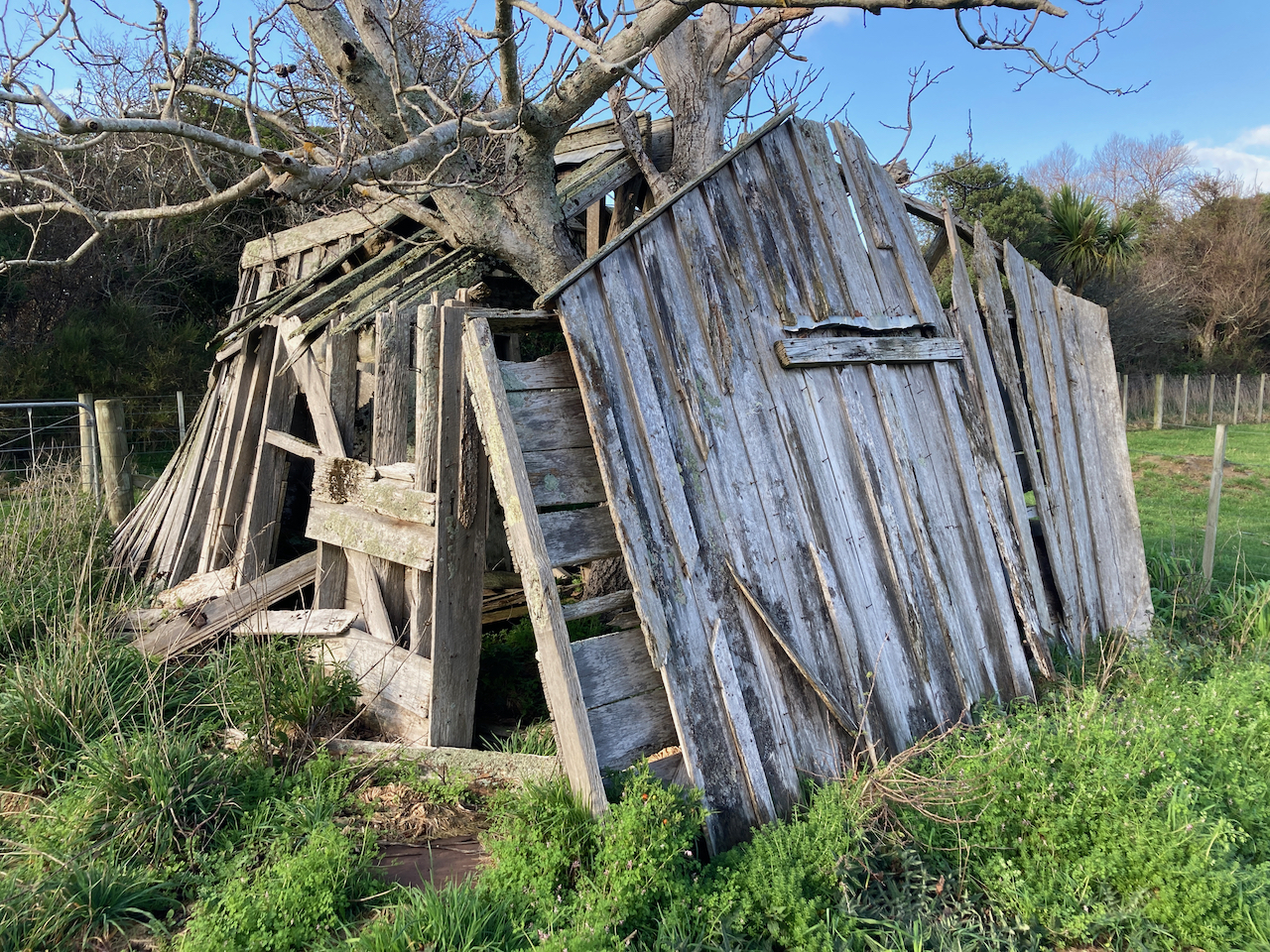
- The ruined observatory in 2020
- Interactive map of Carkeek Observatory
- 41°08′43″S 175°19′24″E
- Location: Murphys Line, Featherston, Wairarapa, New Zealand

History
- Built: circa 1867
- Built for: Stephen Carkeek

Site notes
- Architect: Stephen Carkeek
- Owner: South Wairarapa District Council

The Carkeek Observatory is the earliest surviving astronomical observatory in New Zealand. It was built around 1867 by retired customs officer and amateur astronomer Stephen Carkeek on his farm south of Featherston in the Wairarapa. The timber building was in two parts: an octagonal room with a rotating canvas dome, and a rectangular annex. Carkeek died in 1878 and the disused observatory became a farm equipment shed. As late as the 1980s it was still largely intact, but is now a partial ruin, although the annex and parts of the rotation mechanism can still be seen in place. It was added as a Category I historic place in the New Zealand Heritage List on 26 June 2020, and a protective dome installed in 2026.

== The astronomer ==
Stephen James Carkeek (1815–1878) was born in Swansea, Wales but emigrated to New Zealand with his family in 1841. He began a career in the Customs Service, and in 1849 moved to Wellington where he was appointed Collector of Customs, and later became the colony's first Inspector and Commissioner of Customs.

After an early career at sea, Carkeek retained an interest in naval timekeeping and astronomy, which he pursued through the Wellington Athenaeum and Mechanics Institute. At his instigation the Government built a Provincial Observatory on the waterfront, which connected to a time ball on the roof of the Wellington Customs House.

Carkeek retired in 1866 aged only 51, and moved to the Wairarapa to take up sheep farming. His farm, Torohanga, was just south of Featherston, and on it he built a private observatory to continue his hobby of amateur astronomy, for which he was widely known.

== The observatory ==
Built around 1867, the observatory was modest in size and constructed mostly of locally-sawn tōtara planks with hand-made iron nails. It consisted of two parts: an octagonal room 4.57 m across topped by a dome, and a transit annex 4.24 by 3.45 m on its south-eastern side. The annex contained the entry door, and steps up to the dome room floor, which was elevated 84 cm above the ground. The "dome" over the observation room was likely in fact conical, and was made of canvas over a wooden frame, mounted on iron rollers so it could revolve to compensate for the Earth's rotation.

The design of the observatory was a very common one for amateur astronomers, and it is often called a "Romsey-style" observatory, after the 1871 prefabricated observatory invented and sold by Reverend Edward Lyon Berthon (1813–1899), vicar of Romsey. Both designs – small, inexpensive timber observatories with a rotating sectional dome and an annex – were based on the famous Bedford Observatory, designed by Admiral W. H. Smyth (1788–1865). Smyth's observatory plans were published in his widely-available 1844 book A Cycle of Celestial Objects, which Carkeek may have owned.

Carkeek likely housed two telescopes in the observatory: a 4 inch refractor in the dome room, and a transit telescope in the annex, probable 4.5–6.4 cm. The transit telescope would have been used to determine the latitude and longitude of the observatory, as well as regulating his chronometer by observing 'clock stars'; he may also have kept an astronomical clock. With his refractor telescope he could have observed eclipses and lunar occultations, monitored planets and comets, tracked separation and position of double stars, and searched for new variable stars – all common activities of amateur astronomers at the time with similar equipment. None of his records survive, however, and he published none of his observations.

== Disuse and rediscovery ==
Carkeek died suddenly in 1878, and his chattels and livestock were auctioned on 17 December of that year, but the auction notice did not mention telescopes or astronomy books. The whereabouts of his papers and observation records is unknown.

The observatory building remained when Torohanga was sold to William Hodder, whose family farmed the land for five generations. The observatory was converted into a storage shed for farm tools; the dome and two walls were taken down but stored nearby. Graham Hodder recalls exploring it as a child. "We were told we weren't to play in it or do anything to damage it…I think that's why there's still a presence of ruins there today."

For over 100 years it survived unremarked, until in 1987 Wellington amateur astronomer Sydney Cretney learned about it and visited the site with astronomers Tony Dodson and Garry Wilmshurst. Cretney and Dodson both published articles on the observatory, and in 1994 the Wellington Astronomical Society organised a field trip to see it.

Although in 1987 the observatory was in relatively good condition, by 1994 the building was a partial ruin. The roof and two walls of the dome room were missing, but the rotation mechanism, consisting of a U-shaped channel and iron wheels, was still in place. The transit annex was mostly standing, as a mature walnut tree had grown up through it and out one of the observation slits. By 2014 the dome room had mostly collapsed, the iron base-ring had broken, and the wheels fallen.

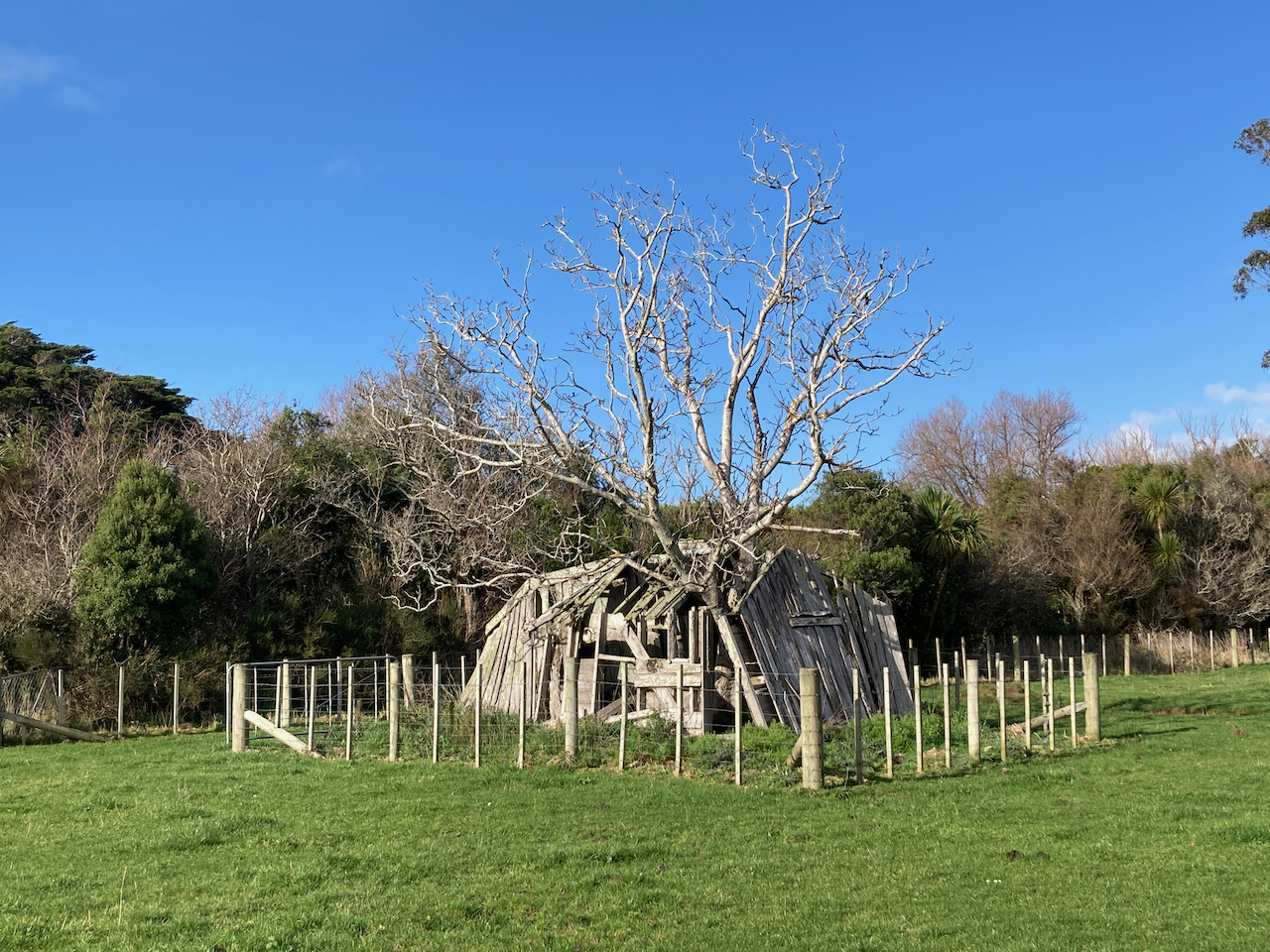
Once a storage shed, the observatory was fenced off in 2020

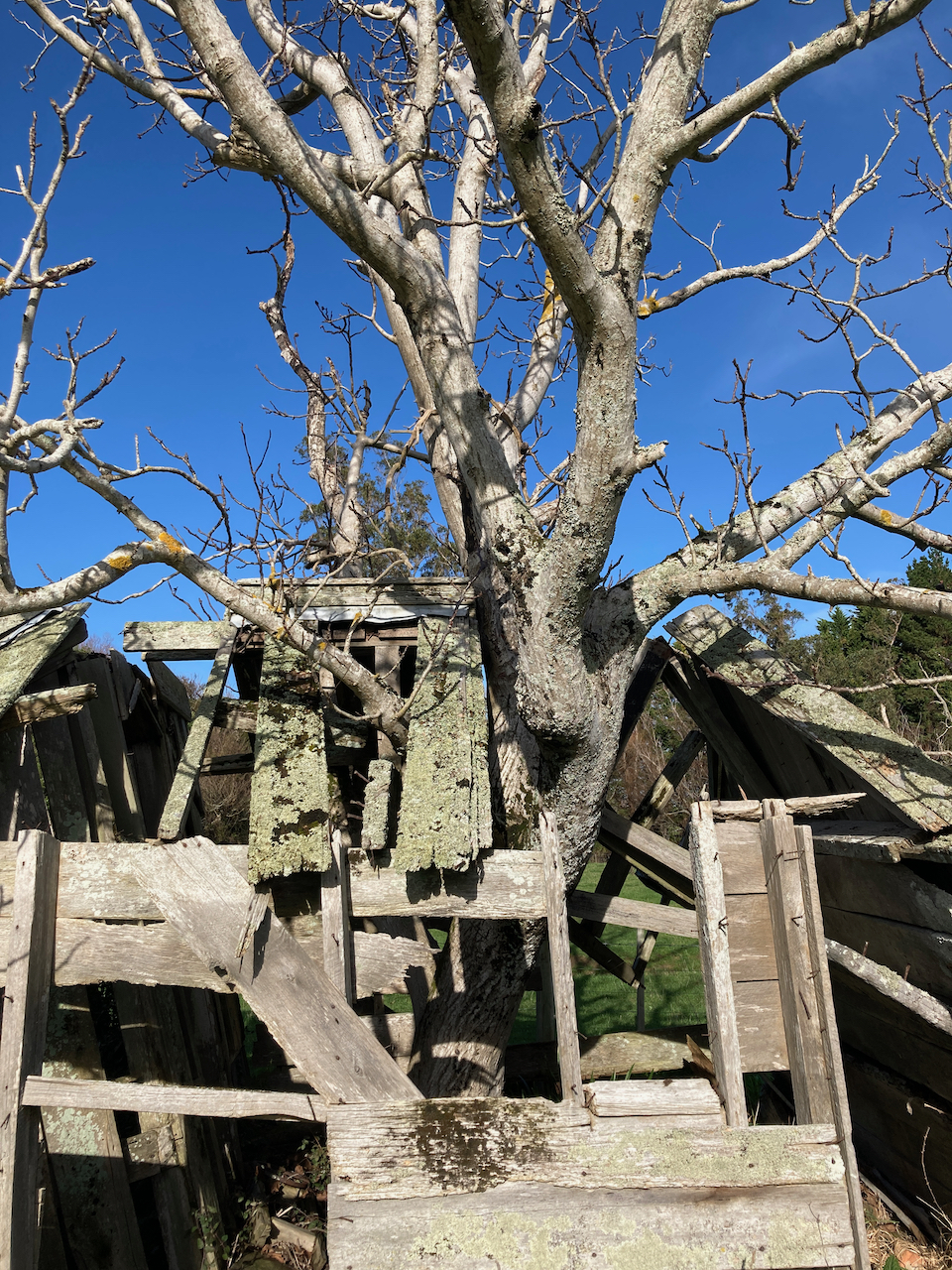
The observatory was supported by a walnut tree growing through a transit window

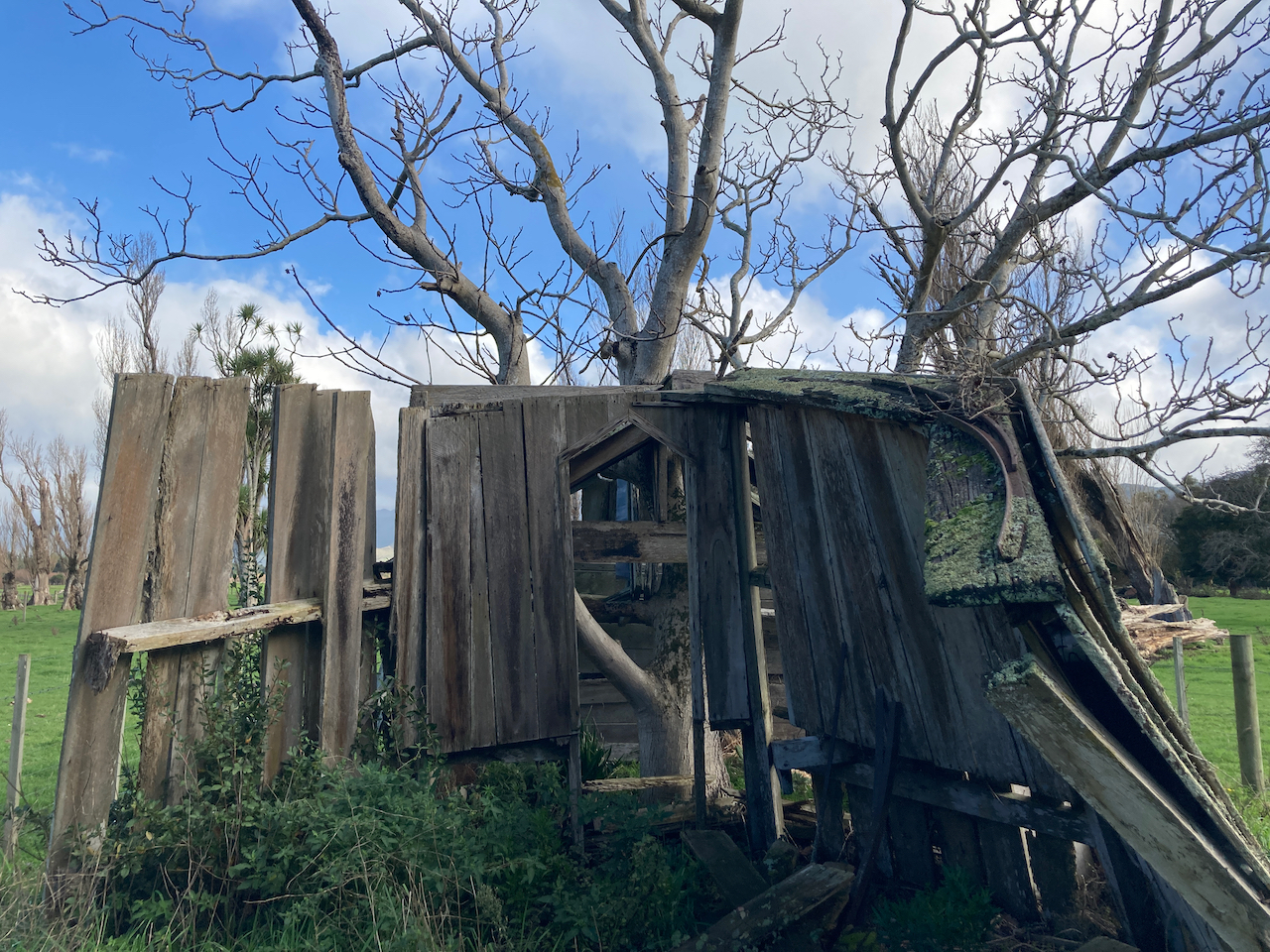
The observation room had mostly collapsed

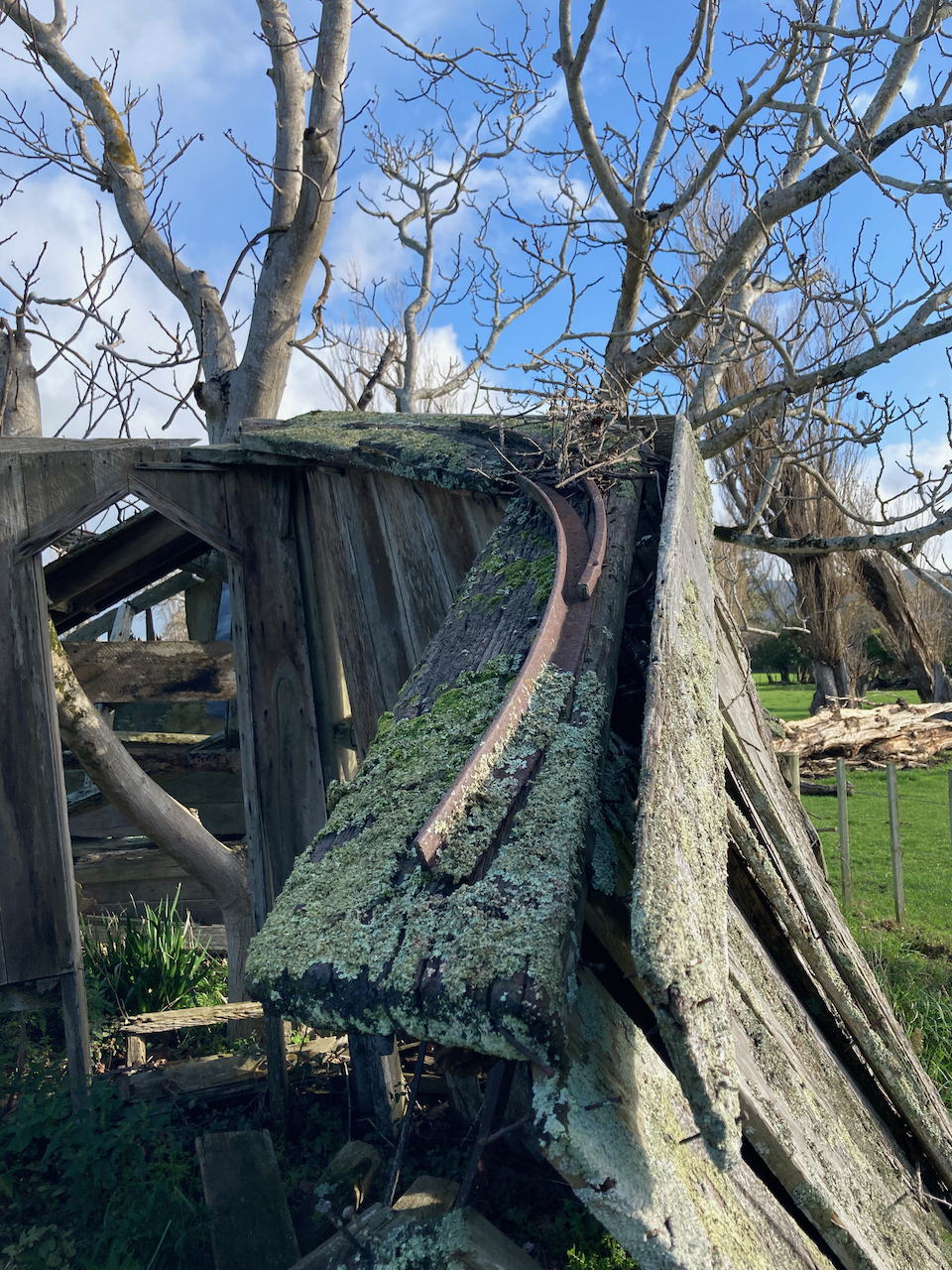
Remains of iron rail for rotating dome

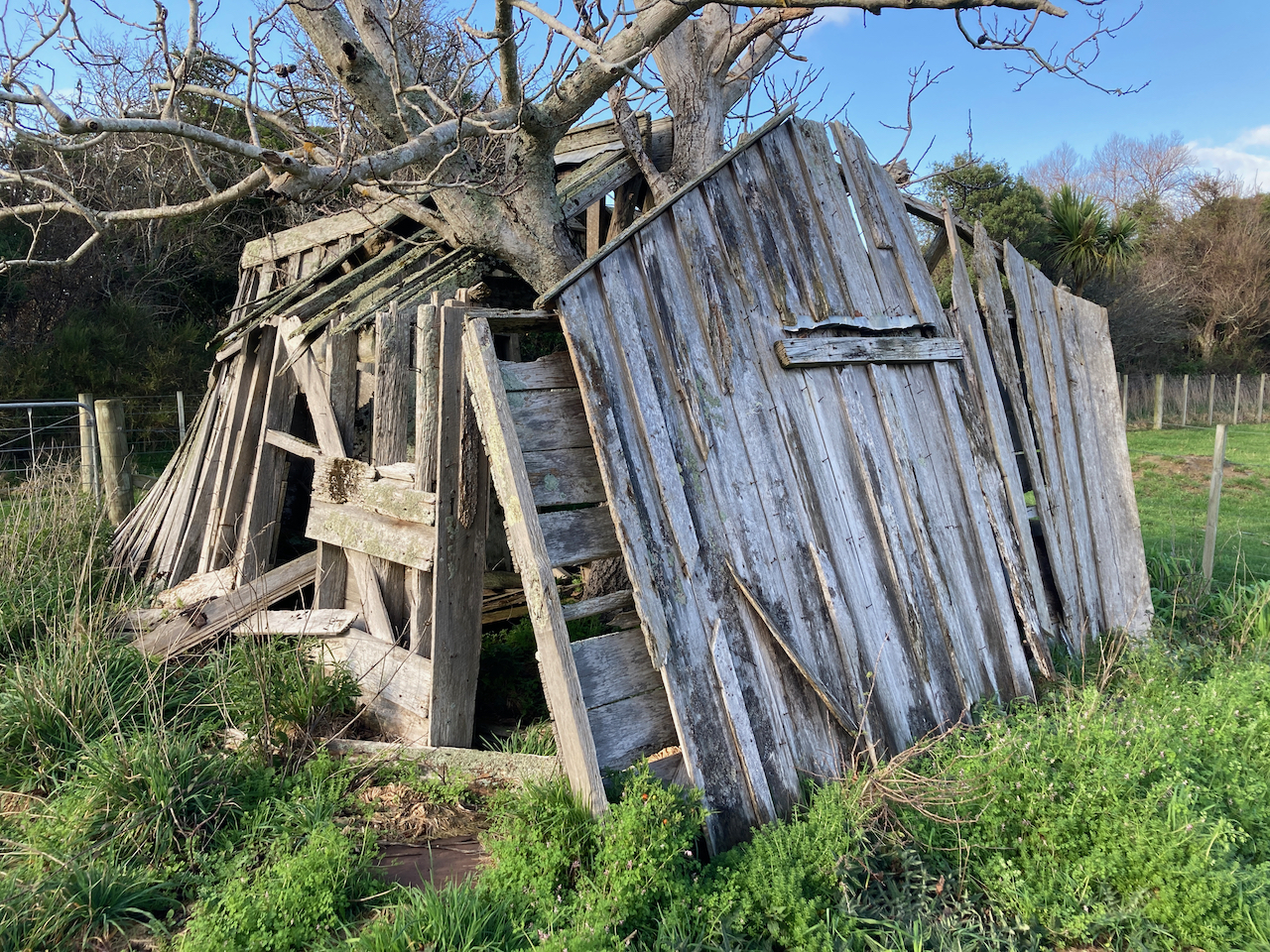

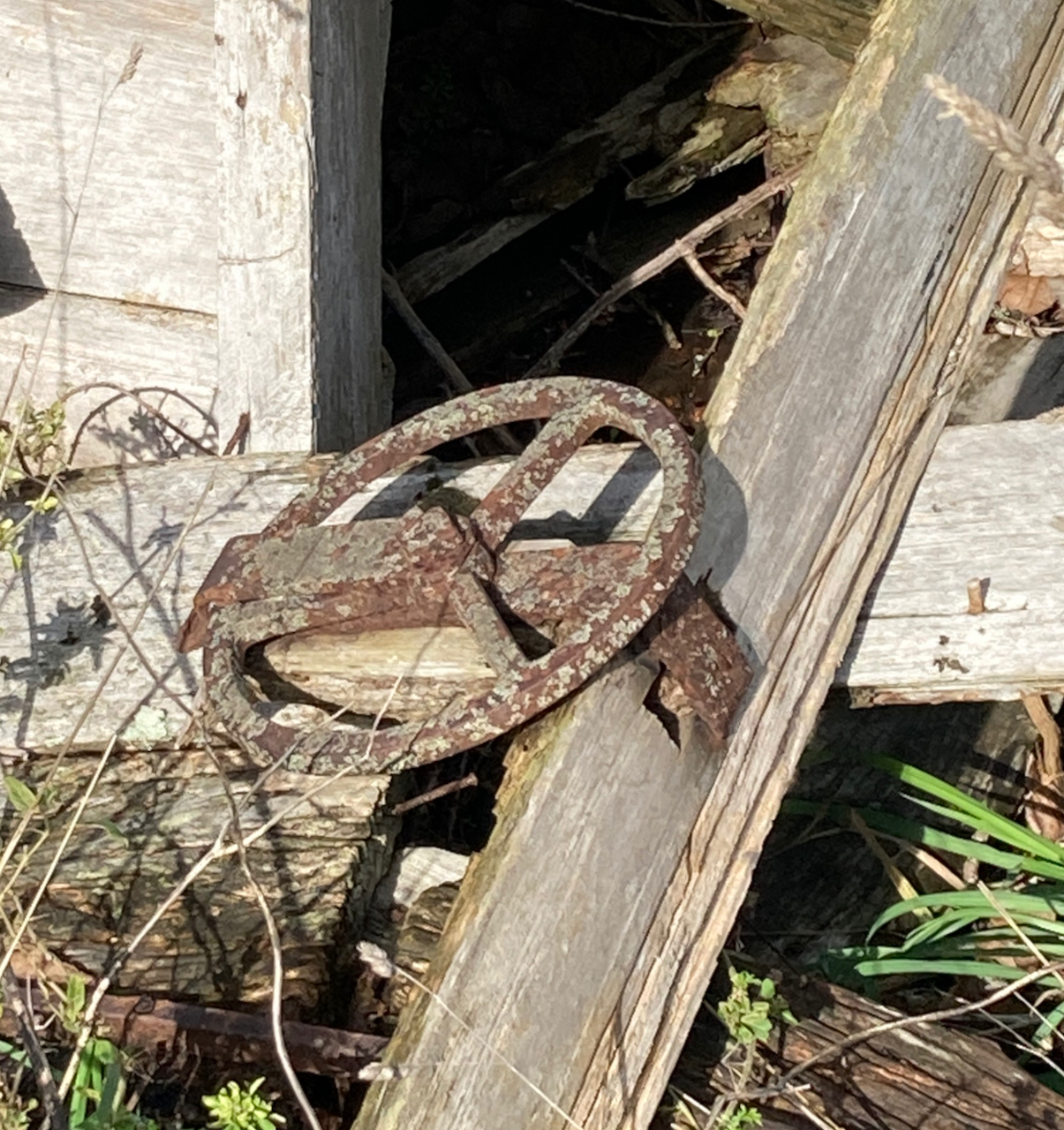
Wheel for rotating dome

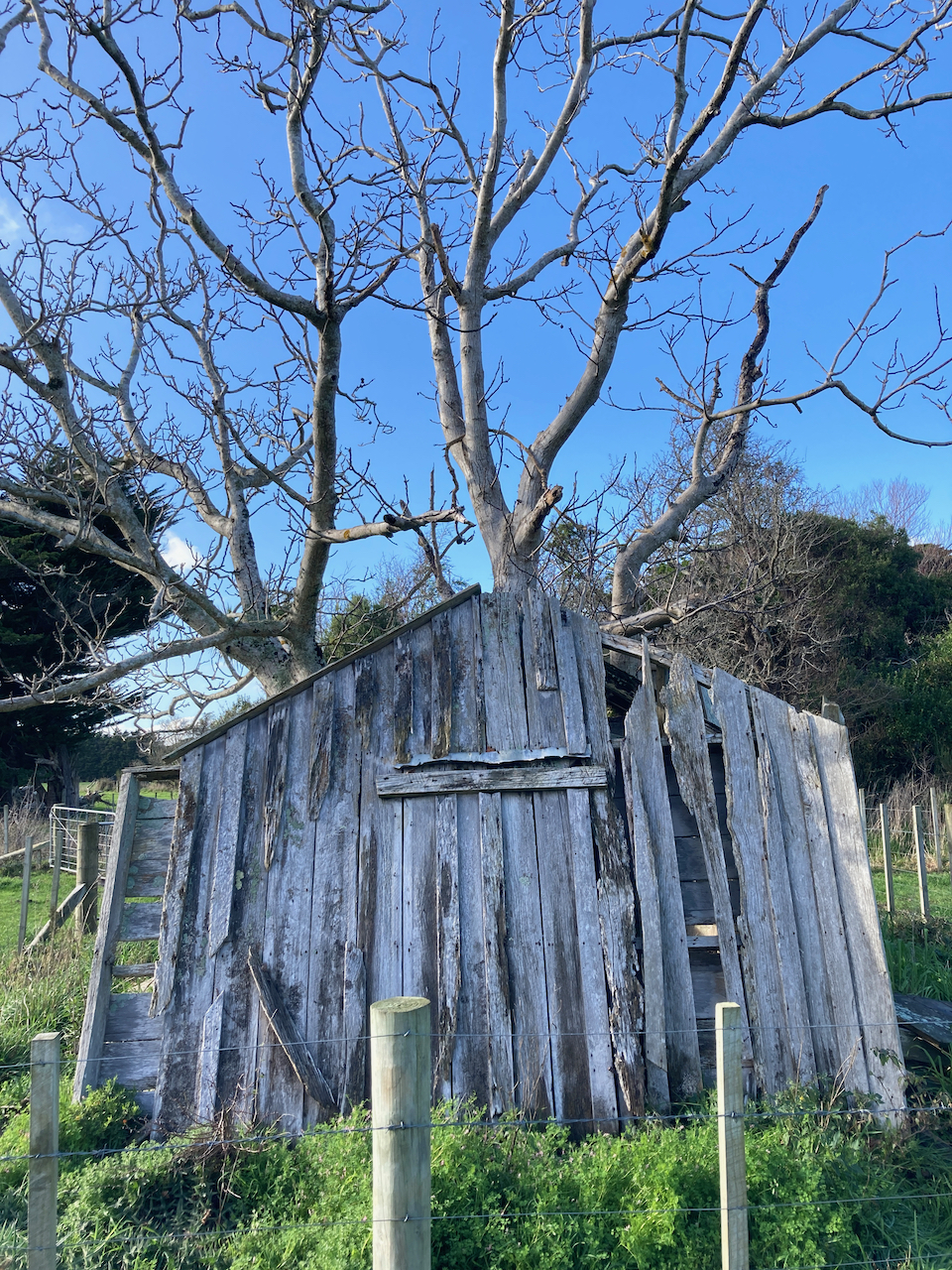

== Protection ==
The observatory was recognised as an important landmark in the history of New Zealand astronomy; the first significant professional observatory, Mt John, was not built until the 1960s, and before then astronomy was carried out by keen amateurs like Carkeek.

The land that was Torohanga, off Murphy's Line south of Featherston, was purchased from the Hodder family in 2014 by the South Wairarapa District Council for the discharge of treated wastewater.

The remains of the Carkeek Observatory was nominated in March 2020 by the Wairarapa Dark Sky Association for Category I status in the New Zealand Heritage List of historic places, as being of "outstanding historic significance". The proposal, supported by the South Wairarapa District Council, meant protection of the observatory became part of the South Wairarapa District Plan, part of a broader Dark Sky Reserve proposal for the area. The boundaries of the reserve had been expanded to the west of Lake Wairarapa to include the observatory site. The plan at that time was to stabilise and protect the observatory rather than restore it, perhaps building a replica beside it. The Dark Sky Association proposed an architect draw up plans so Wairarapa residents could build their own backyard observatories along the same lines.

Heritage New Zealand added the observatory to the Heritage List as a Category I historic place on 26 June 2020, with effect from 15 July 2020. In 2026, 158 years after its construction, the walnut tree was cut back and a protective silo installed above the observatory to protect it from the elements.
