= Vivian Carkeek =

American attorney

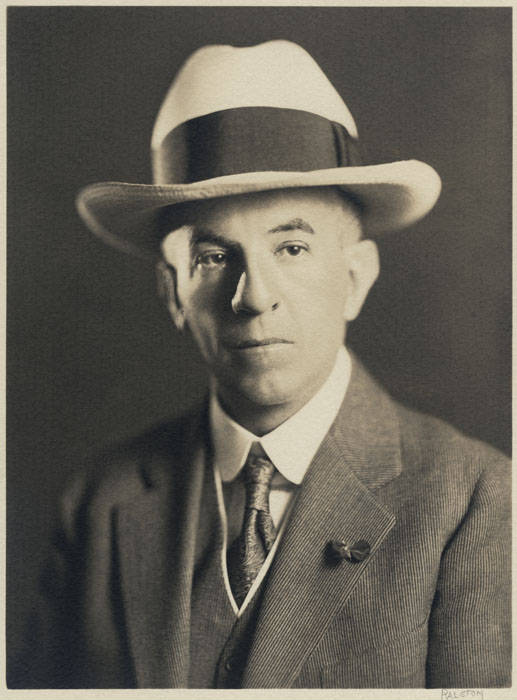
- Vivian Carkeek, circa 1925
- Born: November 23, 1879; Seattle, Washington, U.S.
- Died: December 29, 1934 (aged 55); Seattle, Washington, U.S.
- Education: University of Washington
- Occupation: Attorney
- Relatives: Guendolen Plestcheeff (sister); Sir Arthur Carkeek (uncle); Bessie Westlake Carkeek (cousin)

Vivian Morgan Carkeek (November 23, 1879 - December 29, 1934) was an American attorney and businessman from Seattle, Washington.

Born to Morgan and Emily Carkeek, one of the area's early pioneer families for whom Carkeek Park is named, Carkeek graduated from the University of Washington School of Law's inaugural class in 1901 (a classmate of Walter B. Beals and Walter M. French, who later married Vivian's cousin, Bessie Westlake Carkeek), and was a partner at the firm Carkeek, McDonald, Harris and Coryell. From 1930 to 1931 he taught at the University of Washington School of Law. Carkeek was generally recognized as one of Seattle's powerful and influential civic personalities.

Carkeek, like his mother and sister, was passionately interested in the history of the Seattle area, and he served briefly as president of the Seattle Historic Society, which his mother had founded in 1911, and was a founding officer of the Associates of Eighty-Nine, which was established in 1919 to perpetuate remembrance of the Great Seattle Fire. In the early 1930s he financed the acquisition of theater historian J. Willis Sayre's private collection of 12,500 theatrical programs for the Seattle Public Library. Carkeek also established the "Vivian Carkeek Prize" which is annually awarded "for the best student contribution to the Washington Law Review on a point of Washington law or any point of peculiar interest to Washington attorneys".

== Photographs ==
- Morgan and Vivian Carkeek seated in office, circa 1920s, University of Washington Libraries.
- Vivian Carkeek, circa 1925, University of Washington Libraries.
