= Arthur Carkeek =

Arthur Carkeek NZC
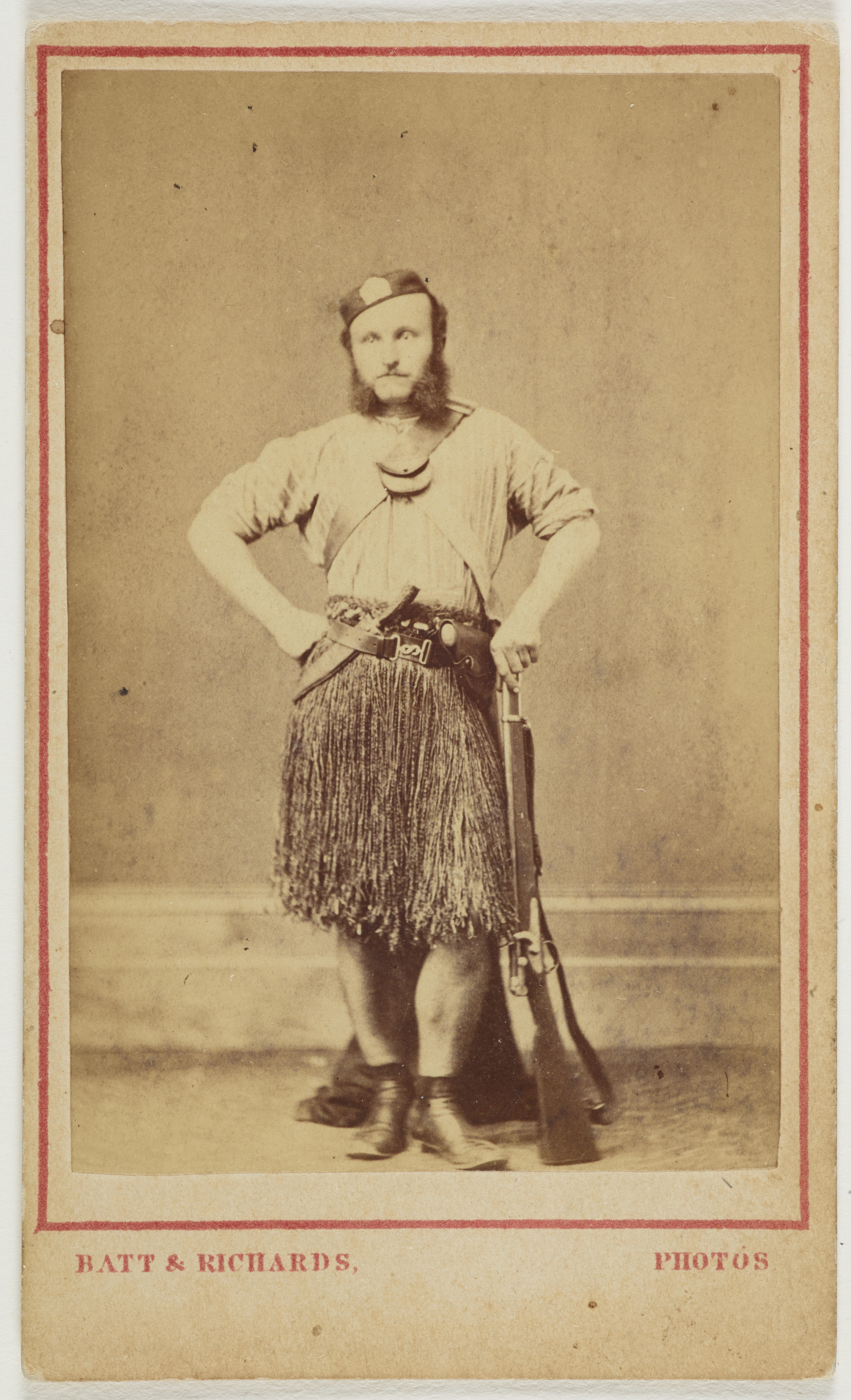
- Carkeek, c. 1870
- Born: Arthur Wakefield Carkeek; 1843; Nelson, New Zealand
- Died: 24 May 1897 aged 54 Blenheim, New Zealand
- Buried: Omaka Cemetery
- Allegiance: British Empire
- Rank: Sergeant
- Conflicts: New Zealand Wars; Tītokowaru's War; Te Kooti's War

Arthur Wakefield Carkeek NZC (1843 – 24 May 1897) was a member of the Armed Constabulary in the New Zealand Wars, and was one of only 23 recipients of the New Zealand Cross for gallantry. Later he was a civil engineer and land surveyor.

== Early life ==
Carkeek was born in Nelson in 1843, a son of Stephen Carkeek, and brother of Frances Ann Stewart (née Carkeek).

== Military career ==
Carkeek was a Sergeant in the Armed Constabulary at Ohinemutu during the Te Kooti's War episode of the New Zealand Wars. On 7 February 1870 the force of Arawas under Captain Mair at Ohinemutu was attacked by Te Kooti and his force. Thomas McDonnell needed to be told of the location of Te Kooti and his force, but Carkeek could not find a Māori willing to go thirty miles through the bush to McDonnell at Tapapa. He decided to go himself, and a Māori agreed to accompany him. They started at daylight on the 8th, and arrived at Tapapa about 3 pm, after traversing dense bush where they were in constant danger of attack.

== Later life and death ==
Carkeek later worked as an engineer and land surveyor based in Ōtaki. He married Edythe Muller, the second daughter of Stephen Lunn Muller, at Blenheim on 2 December 1873; they had a son and daughter.

He died on 24 May 1897 in Wairau Hospital, Blenheim, aged 54 years. He was buried at Omaka Cemetery, Blenheim, with military and Masonic ceremony.
