= Vernon Carkeek =

Australian rules footballer

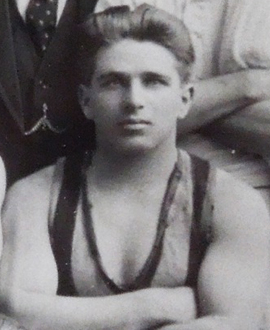

Personal information
- Full name: Vernon Henry Carkeek
- Born: 13 February 1893; Richmond, Victoria
- Died: 28 December 1968 (aged 75); Prahran, Victoria
- Original team: Hawthorn (VFA)
- Height: 169 cm (5 ft 7 in)

Playing career^{1}
Years	Club	Games (Goals)
1915–1916	Collingwood	3 (1)
- ^{1} Playing statistics correct to the end of 1916.

Vernon Carkeek (13 February 1893 – 28 December 1968) was an Australian rules footballer who played with Collingwood in the Victorian Football League (VFL).

Carkeek, who played originally for Hawthorn in the VFA, made three appearances for Collingwood, two in 1915 and one in 1916.

In the 1922 VFL season, he officiated in a single game as a boundary umpire.
