= Guendolen Plestcheeff =

Madame Guendolen Plestcheeff
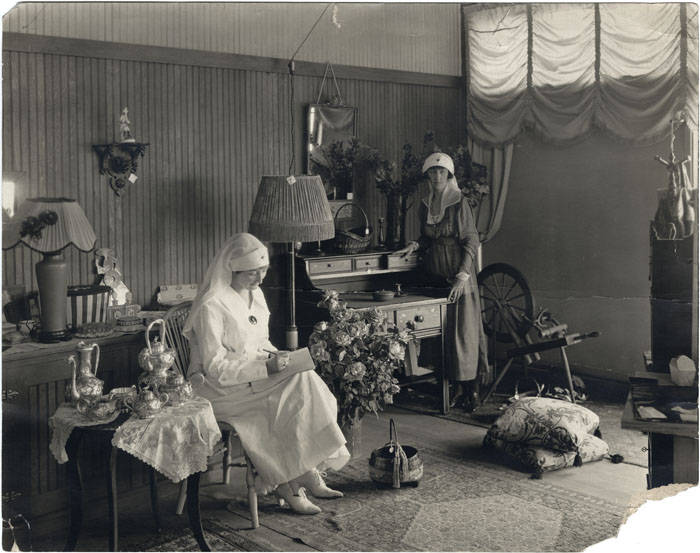
- Born: December 19, 1892; Seattle, Washington, U.S.
- Died: August 30, 1994 (aged 101); Seattle, Washington, U.S.
- Burial place: Lake View Cemetery
- Occupation: Philanthropist
- Spouse: Cav. Paulo Brenna (m. 1921, div.1928); Count Theodore Plestcheeff (m. 1929, d. 1962)
- Parents: Morgan Carkeek (father); Emily Carkeek (mother)
- Relatives: Vivian Carkeek (brother); Sir Arthur Carkeek (uncle); Bessie Westlake Carkeek (cousin)

Guendolen Plestcheeff (née Carkeek, December 19, 1892 – August 30, 1994) was a preservationist and arts advocate from Seattle, Washington, known variously as "Seattle's Grand, Grand Lady" and "the most elegant woman in Seattle". She was the wife of the Count Theodore Plestcheeff.

Born Guendolen Carkeek to Morgan and Emily Carkeek, one of the area's early pioneer families for whom Carkeek Park is named, she started schooling in Seattle before being sent abroad to boarding and finishing schools in Switzerland and the United Kingdom. Upon her return to Seattle, she met Cav. Paulo Brenna, the Italian consul in Seattle. The pair wed in London and eventually moved to Tallinn, Cav. Paulo having been appointed Italian ambassador to Estonia.

By the late 1920s Guendolen Brenna had become one of the most fashionable women in the world and, in 1928, author Bertrand Collins penned a novel, Rome Express, based on her life.

While in Estonia, Guendolen met Count Theodore Plestcheeff, a Russian exile, former imperial courtier, and grandson of Count Paul Stroganov. Plestcheeff shared her interest in arts and antiques. Her marriage with Cav. Paulo ended in 1928 and she wed Count Plestcheeff the following year. Theodore and Guendolen Plestcheeff set-up residence in Seattle at the Sam Hill House in 1937 and spent the rest of their lives together alternating between that property, a summer house on Bainbridge Island, and a home in Paris. In Seattle, Guendolen Plestcheeff continued to be a style icon; in 1948, she was one of two-dozen women surveyed by the Associated Press about what she would be wearing that Easter as part of a poll of "America's best-dressed women" (she answered, "a slim black suit with white blouse and hat").

Guendolen was widowed from Count Plestcheeff in the 1960s.

During her life, Plestcheeff was deeply immersed in the preservation of Seattle historic spaces, serving from 1938 to 1965 as president of the Seattle Historical Society, which had been founded by her mother in 1911. She also was a founding member of the Decorative Arts Council of the Seattle Art Museum, endowed the nonprofit Plestcheeff Institute for the Decorative Arts in 1987, and helped raise the funds used to establish the Museum of History and Industry.

Plestcheeff died in 1994 at the age of 101. The Seattle Art Museum's Plestcheeff Auditorium is named in her honor.
