= Stephen Carkeek =

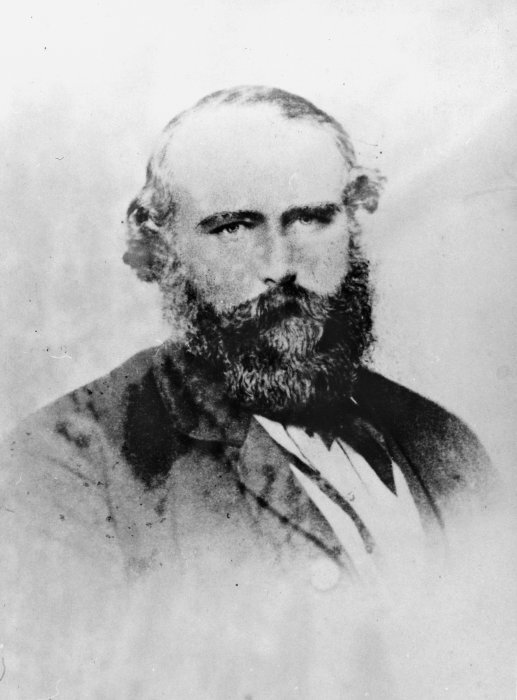
- Carkeek in about 1865
- Born: Stephen James Carkeek; 12 April 1815; Swansea, Wales
- Died: 27 November 1878 (aged 63); Featherston, New Zealand
- Occupations: Senior civil servant Astronomer
- Known for: Carkeek Observatory
- Children: Eight, including Frances Stewart and Arthur Carkeek

Stephen James Carkeek (12 April 1815 – 27 November 1878) was a New Zealand civil servant, the colony's first Inspector of Customs, and the builder of the oldest-surviving observatory in the country.

== Early life and Australia ==
Carkeek was born in Swansea, Wales, on 12 April 1815; his name is Cornish, as his father Morgan was a Cornish sea captain who had moved to Swansea. Stephen Carkeek joined the Navy (possibly after attending the Royal Naval College) and in late 1837 came to New South Wales as the first officer of a convict transportation ship. He then worked for the colonial administration in Sydney and was appointed first officer of the revenue cutter Ranger, a coastal patrol vessel that enforced tariffs, on 21 February 1838. He became commander of the Ranger and its crew of 13, based in Port Phillip, on 23 July 1839. In Sydney he married Martha Piotti (1807–1892), and his daughter Frances was born there in 1840.

== Career in New Zealand ==
On 3 March 1840 he and the Ranger were loaned to the New Zealand colonial administrators (New Zealand was still administered by New South Wales at the time) under the orders of William Hobson. Carkeek acted as a government pilot, and with Felton Mathew surveyed the Firth of Thames, the Waitematā harbour, and the Hauraki Gulf. He also transported government stores and officials around the Bay of Islands and Auckland, confiscating stolen or indebted ships and returning runaway convicts to Sydney.

Carkeek resigned his position in Sydney and was assigned the government brig Victoria on 18 March 1841, transporting Māori chiefs to Mahia, goods to the Marsdens, and George Cooper and his family from Russell (then known as Kororareka) in the Bay of Islands to Auckland. However, after neglecting some victualling paperwork he was forced to hand over command of the brig on 23 April 1841. He and his family settled in the port of Russell, where Carkeek was soon employed as landing-waiter (a customs house officer in charge of the landing of cargo) and tide surveyor. On a salary of £200, he enforced permits and fines on the sale of liquor – a significant revenue stream for the young colony.

On 7 February 1842 Carkeek was ordered to move to the newly established settlement of Nelson, promoted to landing-waiter and sub-collector of customs (but at the same salary). His two-room house, which for nine months had also been serving as the customhouse in Russell, accompanied him when he arrived in the Abercrombie on 5 March – its transportation cost £86 9s, which he had to borrow from his superior. The customhouse was set up on Wakefield Quay, and Carkeek began collecting duties on landed goods and intercepting alcohol being smuggled ashore, which made him unpopular with the settlers. He employed five armed boatmen, "in view of the desperate boats" frequenting the area. By 1843 Carkeek was harbourmaster and member of the board of management, taking over responsibilities for the postal service as well (again at no extra pay); he was also on the Committee of the Nelson Literary Institution. During his time in Nelson Carkeek was known for his long trenchant letters to authorities defending the rights and duties of customs officials.

When Governor FitzRoy abolished Customs on 30 September 1844 (a six-month free-trade experiment which contributed to him being recalled), Carkeek continued all his other duties, as one of the town's only civil servants, on just £92 a year. He was reappointed with back pay in April 1845. At this time Nelson customs was collecting revenue of over £1000 per annum. On 1 July 1849 Carkeek was promoted and moved to Wellington to become Acting Collector of Customs there, at double his Nelson salary. On 14 July 1849 The Nelson Examiner and New Zealand Chronicle noted:

The Government brig, when she sailed last week, took from us our late and much-respected Collector of Customs, Harbour-Master, Postmaster, and Sub-Treasurer. All these offices, and several more, has Mr. Carkeek filled in this settlement since it was first founded, or since some of the departments were established; and a more efficient Government servant, or one held in higher esteem by the public, we are sure is nowhere to the found. As it sometimes will happen to meritorious men, Mr. Carkeek has been, we should think, the hardest-worked and worst-paid, of any officer of the Government in the colony, though filling several very responsible posts.

The "Acting" was dropped from Carkeek's job title after four years in Wellington, and he became Collector of Customs. He took up numerous other responsibilities: postmaster, magistrate, Registrar of Births, Deaths, and Marriages, firearms licensor, running the Interprovincial Steam Postal Service, and arranging the re-roofing of Wellington's first Government House. He was nominated as Collector of Customs to the General Legislative Council on 19 May 1851, and attended the last two sessions (both held in Wellington) before the council ceased to exist in 1853. He stood unsuccessfully for the three-member City of Wellington electorate in the 1855 general election. A pertinent question at the time was the power balance between central and provincial governments, with Carkeek a strong anti-provincialist. There were initially four candidates, and Charles Clifford and William Fitzherbert tried to talk Robert Hart into forming a group to oppose Carkeek. When Hart decided to team up with Carkeek, the other two looked for a third candidate for their team and recruited the Superintendent of the Wellington Province, Isaac Featherston. Carkeek and Hart were narrowly beaten, with Carkeek 14 votes behind Fitzherbert (258 votes to 244). Carkeek was appointed Commissioner of Customs in 1858 and New Zealand's first Secretary and Inspector of Customs in 1865, and was responsible for opening a customs service on the Chatham Islands in 1856. Amongst other posts, he was appointed a Captain commanding the Wellington Militia 2nd Company in 1860, and subsequently the Wellington Rifle Volunteers; although he resigned his commission in 1864, he was often referred to as "Captain Carkeek" thereafter.

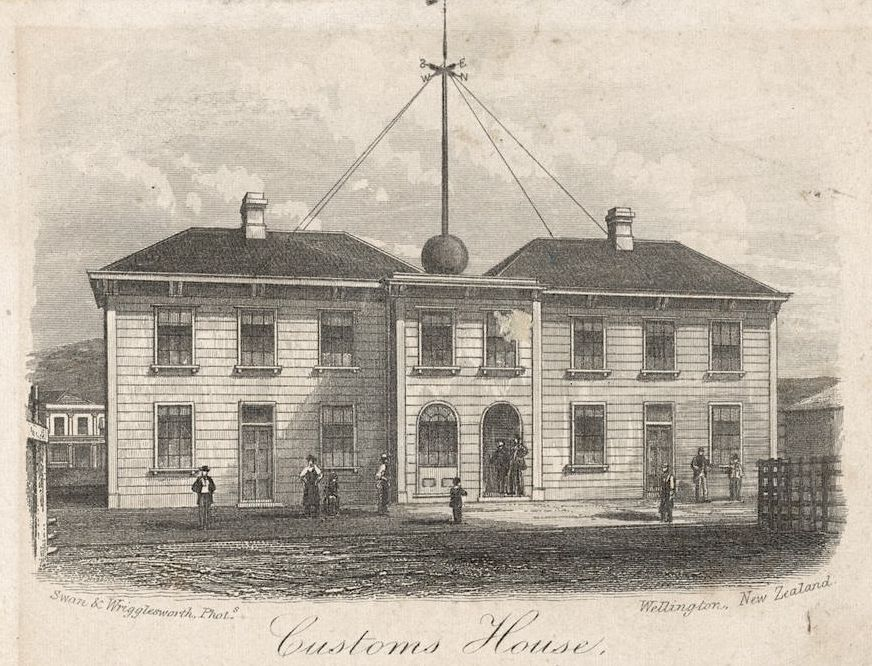
The Customs House building on the Wellington waterfront showing the time ball

During this time he was a keen amateur astronomer and member of the Wellington Athenaeum and Mechanics Institute (the Wellington Independent on 23 January 1866 reported the theft of one of his telescopes). He was also interested in chronometry, helping to repair the clock in St Peter's Church on Willis Street. Both these interests possibly hearkened back to his years at sea. In 1862 Carkeek suggested that a transit observatory and time ball – the first in New Zealand – be added to the new Customs House due to be built on reclaimed land on the Wellington waterfront; a time service was important for captains of visiting ships needing to correct their chronometers. In December 1863 an astronomical clock arrived from Britain, and it was connected electrically to the time ball so that the ball dropped at noon each day (but never on Sundays). The time ball began operation on 8 March 1864. Carkeek used a 23-inch transit instrument in the adjacent observatory to establish its longitude (174° 49′ 15′′). The combined facility was known as the Provincial Observatory; at the time of its first drop, Carkeek claimed the time ball was the first in the Southern Hemisphere, and himself the country's first astronomer.

== Retirement and family ==
Carkeek took early retirement from the civil service in on 1 April 1866 at the age of 50, on a pension of £364. He was replaced by William Seed (1827–1890). Carkeek moved to the Wairarapa to become a sheep farmer on Torohanga, a 200-acre property just south of Featherston – a town named after his political opponent. The Wellington Independent noted at the time:

S. Carkeek, Esq., Inspector of H.M. Customs for the Colony of New Zealand has resigned his appointment, and after a service of many years retires into private life. By his kindness and urbanity, Mr. Carkeek has endeared himself to many in this city, and it will be with feelings of unfeigned regret that the announcement of his retirement is learnt. For some time past severe indisposition has prevented Mr. Carkeek attending to his duties, and even now, though in a great measure convalescent, he is far from well.

In his retirement in Featherston, Carkeek was heavily involved in the community: a magistrate, chairman of the local school committee, and member of the Agricultural and Pastoral Association. In 1878 he had tired of sheep farming, and decided to sell Torohanga. After visiting Tauranga to see his daughter Ellen, wife of the postmaster, he resolved to move there, but a few weeks later he took ill and died at the age of 63. His death certificate referred to chronic alcoholism and bronchitis. He and his wife Martha had eight children, four of which survived to adulthood: brothers Arthur (1843–1897) and Morgan (1846–1927) were both surveyors, and two daughters, Frances Ann Stewart (1840–1916) and Martha Ellen Sheath (1851–1886). After the death of his father in Wales, Carkeek had brought his mother and sister Frances (1820–1869) to Nelson; his mother died there in 1849, and his sister married hotel keeper Thomas Davis in 1856 and moved to Palmerston.

== Observatory ==
Carkeek was a keen amateur astronomer, and built a small observatory out of tōtara and hand-made iron nails for his two telescopes. He worked alone, supplying meteorological observations to the local newspaper, and observing Jupiter's satellites, lunar eclipses, and moon culminations. In early March 1871 the observatory was well established, as The Nelson Examiner and New Zealand Chronicle noted:

The stream which comes from the Rimutaka [Mountains], forms the eastern boundary of Mr. Carkeek’s garden. This rose so high as to flood the house, in which there was at one time nearly three feet of water ... Mr. Carkeek had just had his observatory refitted, and shelves with valuable books raised from the floor, the outsides of which became covered with mud, but fortunately the insides are very little damaged. The garden has a great deal of mud left upon it ...

Both English and American astronomical groups visited New Zealand to observe the 1874 transit of Venus, and Carkeek's observatory was mentioned as one facility that might be used, but he did not in the end participate.

The partly ruined building still remains, and is New Zealand's oldest surviving observatory. After his death in 1878 his chattels and livestock were auctioned on 17 December of that year, but the auction notice did not mention telescopes or astronomy books. What happened to his "numerous valuable notes and observations", promised to the Wairarapa Standard just weeks before he died, is unknown. The historic importance of the observatory was not realised for over a century, but on 26 June 2020 Heritage New Zealand added it to the Heritage List as a Category I historic place.
