= Timeline of U.S. state and territory flags =

This article contains a list of the flags and/or modifications made to the flags of current U.S. states and territories, through the present day.

== U.S. states ==
State	Pre-1800s	1800s	1830s	1840s	1850s	1860s			1870s		1880s	1890s	1900s		1910s	1920s	1930s	1940s	1950s	1960s	1970s	1980s	1990s	2000s	2010s	2020s		Current	State
Alabama							/ 1861	1865					1895																Alabama
Alaska																	1927												Alaska
Arizona																1917													Arizona
Arkansas															1913	1923	1924								2011				Arkansas
California															1911														California
Colorado														1907	1911						1964								Colorado
Connecticut													1897																Connecticut
Delaware															1913														Delaware
Florida							1861	1865	1868				1900									1985							Florida
Georgia						1861	1865		1879				1902	1906		1920				1956				2001	2003				Georgia
Hawaii					1845																							Hawaii	
Idaho																				1957									Idaho
Illinois															1915						1969								Illinois
Indiana																1917													Indiana
Iowa																1921									2018				Iowa
Kansas																	1927				1961								Kansas
Kentucky																1918					1963								Kentucky
Louisiana							1861 1861								1912									2006	2010				Louisiana
Maine															1909													State of Maine	Maine
Maryland							Maryland						1904																Maryland
Massachusetts															1908						1971								Massachusetts
Michigan															1911														Michigan
Minnesota												1893 1893								1957		1983					2024		Minnesota
Mississippi							1861	1865					1894										1996	2001		2021			Mississippi
Missouri															1913														Missouri
Montana														1905								1981							Montana
Nebraska																					1963								Nebraska
Nevada														1905	1915		1929						1991						Nevada
New Hampshire															1909			1931											New Hampshire
New Jersey													1896																New Jersey
New Mexico															1915	1920													New Mexico
New York	1778												1901													2020			New York
North Carolina							1861					1885											1991						North Carolina
North Dakota															1911														North Dakota
Ohio													1902																Ohio
Oklahoma															1911		1925		1941			1988		2006					Oklahoma
Oregon																1917	/ 1925												Oregon
Pennsylvania														1907															Pennsylvania
Rhode Island	1640									1877	1882		1897																Rhode Island
South Carolina	1775						1861								1910			1940											South Carolina
South Dakota															1909						1963		1992						South Dakota
Tennessee													1897	1905															Tennessee
Texas			1836	1839																						Texas			
Utah													1903		1913										2011		2024		Utah
Vermont	1770	1804		1837												1923													Vermont
Virginia							1861	1865											1950										Virginia
Washington																1923					1967								Washington
Washington D.C.																	1924	1938										District of Columbia	Washington D.C.
West Virginia														1907			1929												West Virginia
Wisconsin									1866						1913							1981							Wisconsin
Wyoming																1917													Wyoming
State																												Current	State
State	Pre-1800s	1800s	1830s	1840s	1850s	1860s			1870s		1880s	1890s	1900s		1910s	1920s	1930s	1940s	1950s	1960s	1970s	1980s	1990s	2000s	2010s	2020s		Current	State

== Territories ==
Territory	Pre-1850s			1850s	1860s	1870s	1880s	1890s	1900s		1910s	1920s	1930s	1940s			1950s	1960s		1970s	1980s	1990s	2000s	2010s	2020s	Current	Territory
American Samoa					1858	1873	1879	1887	1900	1908	1912						1959	1960									American Samoa
Guam								1885	1898	1908	1912			1941	1944	1947	1948										Guam
Northern Mariana Islands								1885	1899		1914	1919			1944	1947			1965	1972	1976	1989					Northern Mariana Islands
Puerto Rico	1506	1701	1760	1785		1873			1895								1952					1995					Puerto Rico
U.S. Virgin Islands	1672											1917	1921													United States Virgin Islands	U.S. Virgin Islands
Territory																										Current	Territory
Territory	Pre-1850s			1850s	1860s	1870s	1880s	1890s	1900s		1910s	1920s	1930s	1940s			1950s	1960s		1970s	1980s	1990s	2000s	2010s	2020s	Current	Territory

== See also ==
- Flags of the U.S. states and territories
