= Flags of the U.S. states and territories =

Map showing the flags of the 50 states of the United States

The flags of the U.S. states, territories, and the District of Columbia (Washington, D.C.) exhibit a variety of regional influences and local histories, as well as different styles and design principles. Modern U.S. state flags date from the turn of the 20th century, when states considered distinctive symbols for the 1893 World's Columbian Exposition in Chicago, Illinois. Most U.S. state flags were designed and adopted between 1893 and World War I, although there are a few exceptions.

The most recently adopted state flag is that of Minnesota, adopted on May 11, 2024, while the most recently adopted territorial flag is that of the Northern Mariana Islands, adopted on July 1, 1985. The flag of the District of Columbia was adopted in 1938. Recent legislation in Massachusetts (2021) and Illinois (2024) have started the process of redesigning their state flags. Maine put a flag redesign on the ballot in November 2024, but the new design lost in a referendum.

Many of the state flags share a design pattern consisting of the state seal superimposed on a monochrome background, commonly a shade of blue.

== Current state flags ==
Presented in alphabetical order, along with their respective dates of adoption.

Flag of Alabama
(February 16, 1895)

Flag of Alaska
(May 2, 1927)

Flag of Arizona
(February 27, 1917)

Flag of Arkansas
(February 26, 1913)

Flag of California
(February 3, 1911)

Flag of Colorado
(June 5, 1911)

Flag of Connecticut
(September 9, 1897)

Flag of Delaware
(July 24, 1913)

Flag of Florida
(November 6, 1900)

Flag of Georgia
(February 19, 2003)

Flag of Hawaii
(May 25, 1845)

Flag of Idaho
(March 12, 1907)

Flag of Illinois
(September 17, 1969)

Flag of Indiana
(May 31, 1917)

Flag of Iowa
(March 29, 1921)

Flag of Kansas
(September 24, 1961)

Flag of Kentucky
(March 26, 1918)

Flag of Louisiana
(July 1, 1912)

Flag of Maine
(February 23, 1909)

Flag of Maryland
(March 9, 1904)

Flag of Massachusetts
(March 18, 1908)

Flag of Michigan
(August 1, 1911)

Flag of Minnesota
(May 11, 2024)

Flag of Mississippi
(January 11, 2021)

Flag of Missouri
(March 22, 1913)

Flag of Montana
(July 1, 1981)

Flag of Nebraska
(April 2, 1925)

Flag of Nevada
(March 26, 1929)

Flag of New Hampshire
(1909)

Flag of New Jersey
(May 11, 1896)

Flag of New Mexico
(March 19, 1925)

Flag of New York
(April 2, 1901)

Flag of North Carolina
(March 9, 1885) (Note: Modified in 1991)

Flag of North Dakota
(March 11, 1911)

Flag of Ohio
(May 9, 1902)

Flag of Oklahoma
(April 2, 1925)

Flag of Oregon (obverse)
(April 15, 1925)

Flag of Oregon (reverse)

Flag of Pennsylvania
(June 13, 1907)

Flag of Rhode Island
(November 1, 1897)

Flag of Rhode Island (fringed)

Flag of South Carolina
(January 28, 1861)

Flag of South Dakota
(November 9, 1992)

Flag of Tennessee
(April 17, 1905)

Flag of Texas
(January 25, 1839)

Flag of Utah
(March 9, 2024)

Flag of Vermont
(June 1, 1923)

Flag of Virginia
(March 28, 1912)

Flag of Washington
(March 5, 1923)

Flag of West Virginia
(March 7, 1929)

Flag of Wisconsin
(May 1, 1981)

Flag of Wyoming
(January 31, 1917)

== Current federal district flag ==
This is the current flag of the District of Columbia.

Flag of the District of Columbia
(federal district)
(October 15, 1938)

== Current territory flags ==
These are the current official flags of the five permanently inhabited territories of the United States.

Flag of American Samoa
(April 17, 1960)

Flag of Guam
(February 9, 1948)

Flag of the Northern Mariana Islands
(July 1, 1989)

Flag of Puerto Rico
(July 22, 1952)

Flag of the U.S. Virgin Islands
(May 17, 1921)

== Current state ensigns ==
Maine and Massachusetts have ensigns for use at sea.

Merchant and marine flag of Maine
(1939)

Naval and maritime flag of Massachusetts
(1971)

Flag of the South Carolina Naval Militia

== Former state ensigns ==
Flag of the Georgia State Navy
(1778 – 1779)

Former Naval and maritime flag of Massachusetts
(1775 – 1971)

Naval ensign of New York (1775)

Flag of the Pennsylvania Navy
(1775 – 1783)

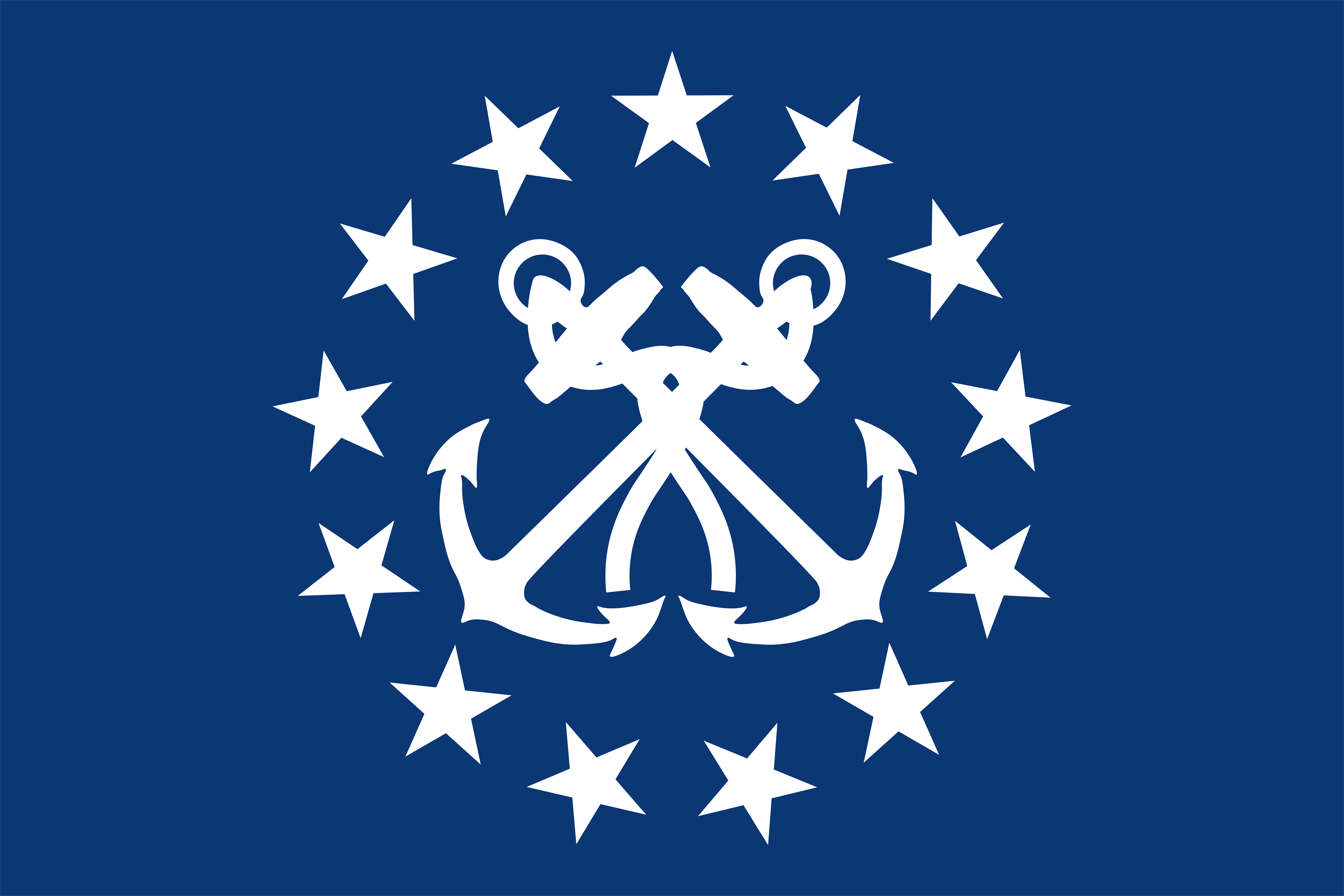
Flag of the California Naval Militia (1891)

== Commemorative state flags ==
Alabama Centennial Flag (1919)

Alabama Sesquicentennial Flag (1969)

Alabama Bicentennial Flag (2019)

Illinois Centennial Flag (1918)

Illinois Sesquicentennial Flag (1968)

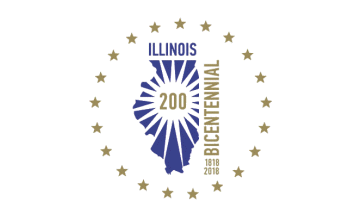
Illinois Bicentennial Flag (2018)

Indiana Centennial Flag (1916)

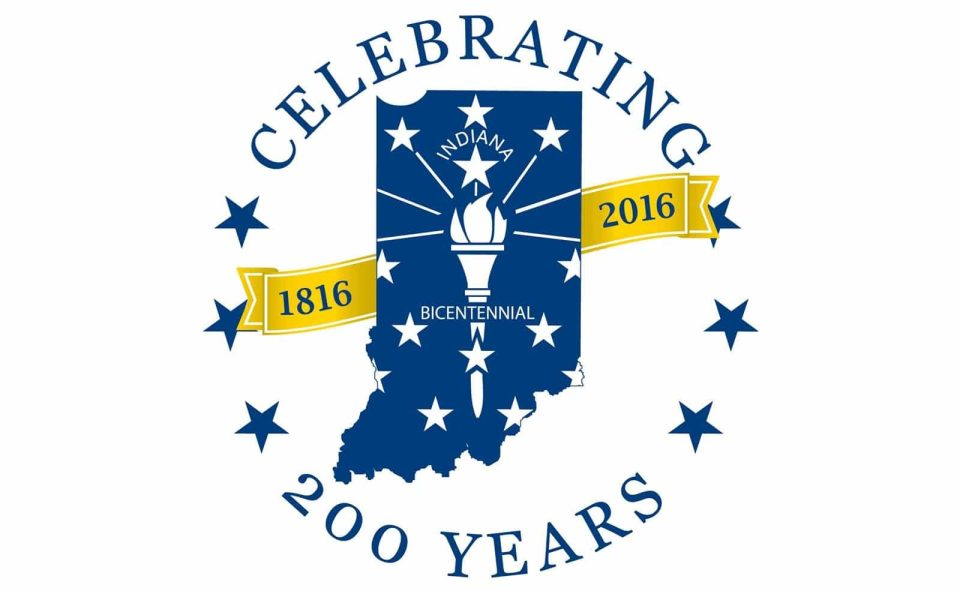
Indiana Bicentennial Flag (2016)

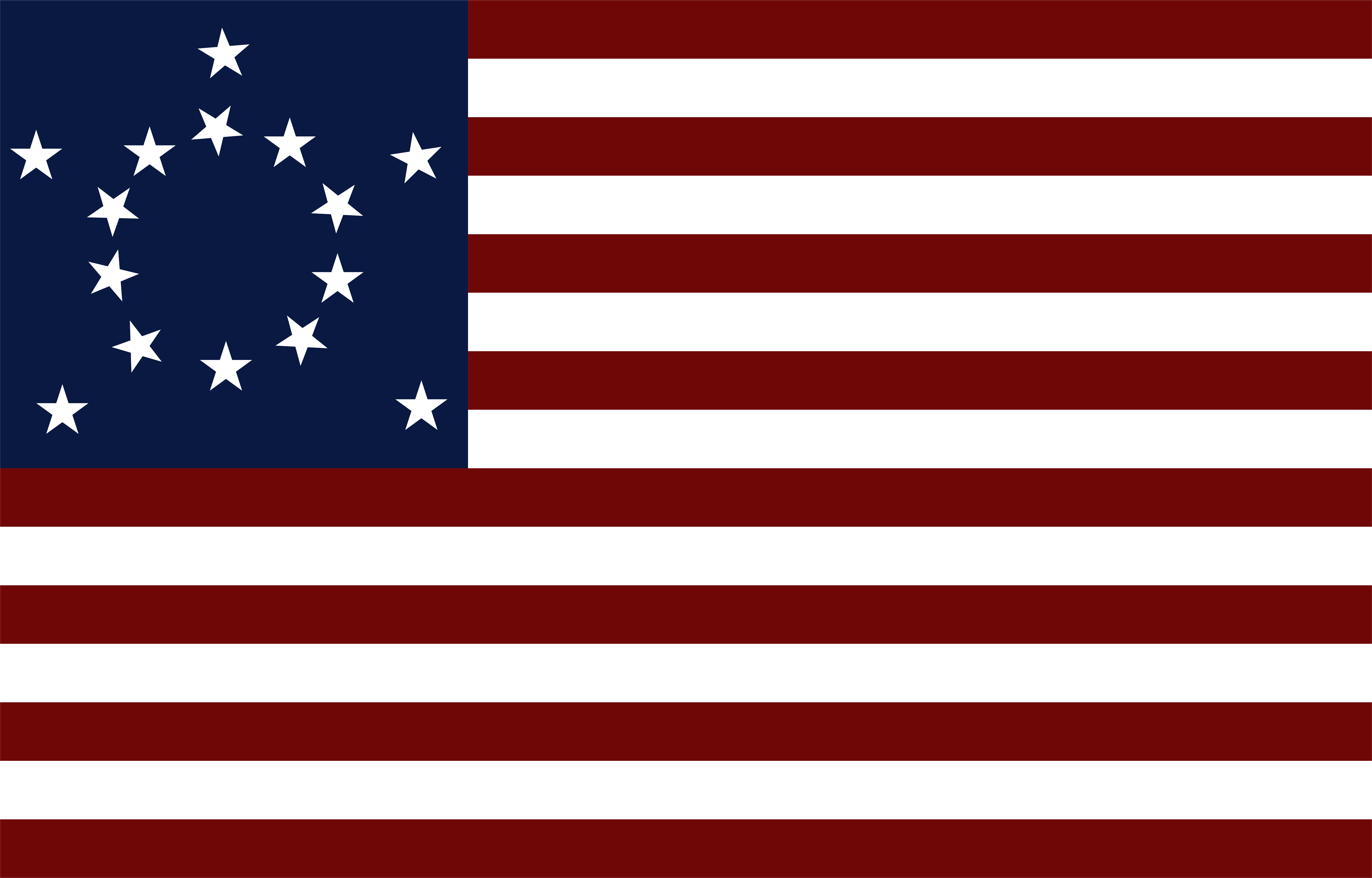
Kentucky Bicentennial Flag (1992)

Maine Bicentennial Flag (2020)

Mississippi Bicentennial Flag (2017)

New Jersey Tricentennial Flag (1964)

Tennessee Centennial Flag (1896)

Texas Centennial Flag (1936)

Texas Sesquicentennial Flag (1986)

Utah Quasquicentennial Flag (2021)

Vermont Centennial Flag (1891)

== Historical state and territory flags ==
=== Former state flags ===
Flag of Alabama
(November 7, 1861 – November 12, 1865)

Flag of Alabama
(reverse, November 7, 1861 – November 12, 1865)

Flag of Arkansas
(February 26, 1913 – 1923)

Flag of Arkansas
(1923 – 1924)

Flag of Arkansas before standardization
(1924 – February 28, 2011)

Flag of California
(1861 – 1864)

Flag of California
(1864 – February 3, 1911)

Flag of California before standardization
(February 3, 1911 – June 14, 1953)

Flag of Colorado
(1907 – June 5, 1911)

Flag of Colorado before standardization
(June 5, 1911 – March 31, 1964)

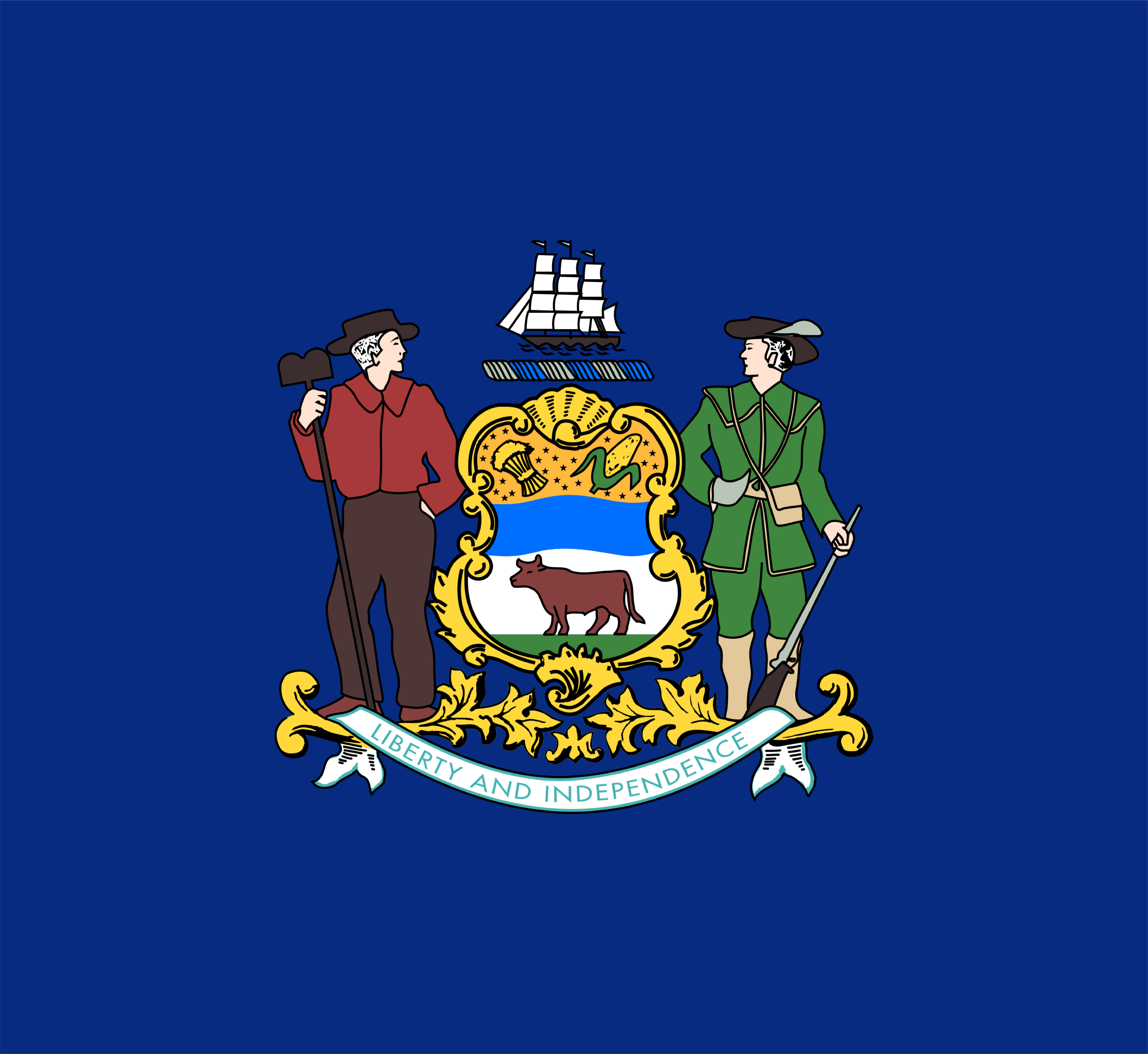
Flag of Delaware
(1862 – July 24, 1913)

Flag of Florida
(de facto, 1845)

Flag of Florida
(de facto, January 13 – September 12, 1861)

Flag of Florida
(September 13, 1861 – May 5, 1868)

Flag of Florida
(May 6, 1868 – November 6, 1900)

Flag of Florida before standardization of seal
(November 6, 1900 – May 21, 1985)

Flag of Georgia
(de facto, 1861 – 1879)

Flag of Georgia
(1879 – 1902)

Flag of Georgia
(1902 – 1906)

Flag of Georgia
(1906 – 1920)

Flag of Georgia
(1920 – February 13, 1956)

Flag of Georgia
(February 13, 1956 – January 31, 2001)

Flag of Georgia
(January 31, 2001 – February 19, 2003)

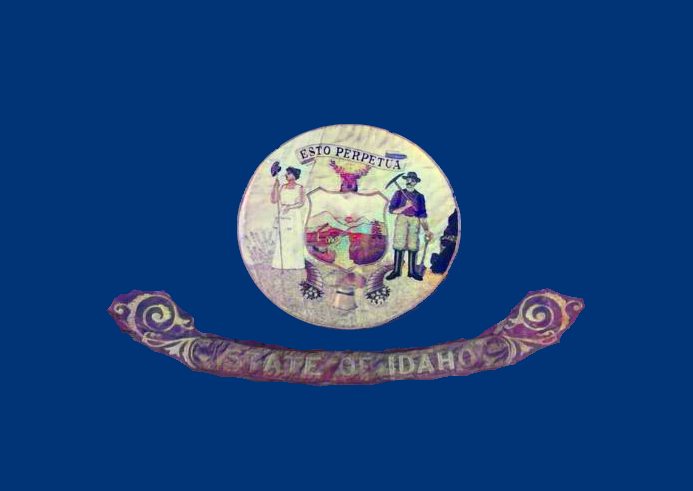
Flag of Idaho before first standardization
(March 12, 1907 – March 15, 1927)

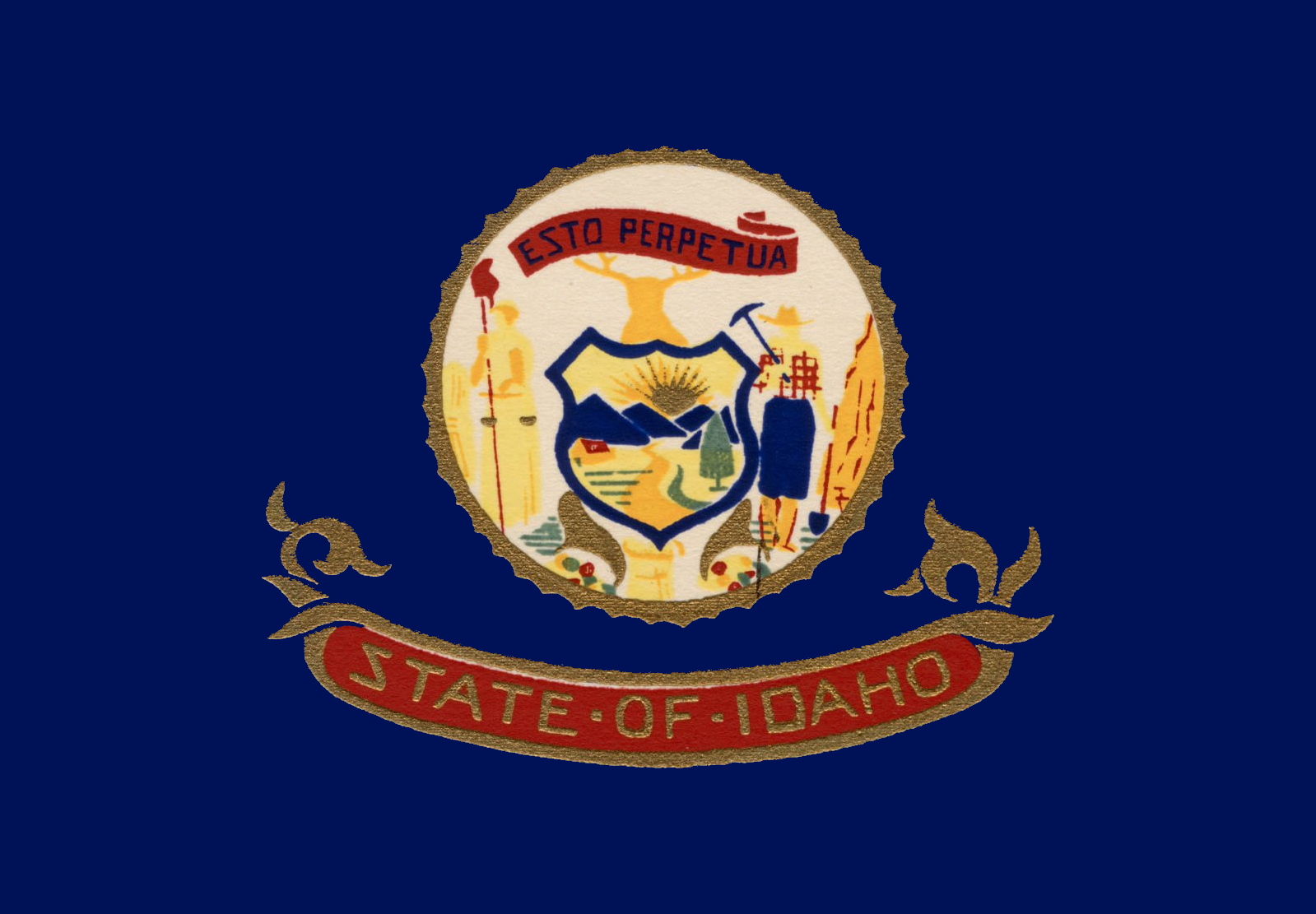
Flag of Idaho before second standardization
(March 15, 1927 – March 1957)

Flag of Illinois
(July 6, 1915 – September 17, 1969)

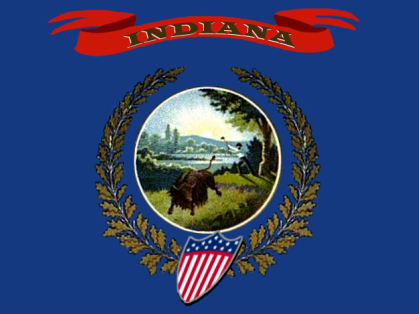
Flag of Indiana
(1885 – May 31, 1917)

Flag of Indiana
(1901 – 1955)

Banner of Indiana before standardization
(May 31, 1917 – 1955)

Banner of Kansas
(1925 – 1927)

Flag of Kansas
(1927 – September 24, 1961)

Flag of Kentucky before standardization
(March 26, 1918 – June 14, 1962)

Flag of Louisiana
(February 11, 1861 – July 1, 1912)

Flag of Louisiana before first standardization
(July 1, 1912 – May 7, 2006)

Flag of Louisiana before second standardization
(May 7, 2006 – November 22, 2010)

Flag of Maine
(March 21, 1901 – February 23, 1909)

Flag of Massachusetts
(reverse, March 18, 1908 – 1971)

Flag of Michigan
(obverse, 1837 – 1865)

Flag of Michigan
(reverse, 1837 – 1865)

Flag of Michigan
(obverse, 1865 – August 1, 1911)

Flag of Michigan
(reverse, 1865 – August 1, 1911)

Flag of Minnesota
(obverse, February 28, 1893 – August 1957)

Flag of Minnesota
(reverse, February 28, 1893 – August 1957)

Flag of Minnesota
(August 1957 – August 1983)

Flag of Minnesota
(August 1983 – May 11, 2024)

Flag of Mississippi
(1861 – 1865)

Flag of Mississippi before standardization
(February 7, 1894 – 1996)

Flag of Mississippi
(1996 – June 30, 2020)

Flag of Missouri
(June 5, 1861 – March 22, 1913)

Flag of Montana
(1905 – July 1, 1981)

Flag of Nebraska
(de facto, 1915 – April 2, 1925)

Flag of Nevada
(July 20, 1905 – April 2, 1925)

Flag of Nevada
(1915 – 1929)

Flag of Nevada before revision
(1929 – July 25, 1991)

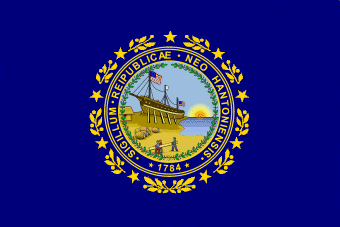
Flag of New Hampshire before standardization of seal
(1909 – November 30, 1931)

Flag of New Mexico
(de facto, 1912 – March 19, 1925)

Flag of New York
(1858 – 1896)

Flag of New York
(1896 – April 2, 1901)

Flag of New York before standardization
(April 2, 1901 – April 2020)

Flag of North Carolina
(March 16, 1861 – 1865)

Flag of North Carolina before standardization
(March 1885 – June 24, 1991)

Flag of Oklahoma
(1911 – April 2, 1925)

Flag of Oklahoma
(April 2, 1925 – 1941)

Flag of Oklahoma
(1941 – June 14, 1988)

Flag of Oklahoma
(June 14, 1988 – November 1, 2006)

Flag of Oregon
(de facto, 1917 – February 26, 1925)

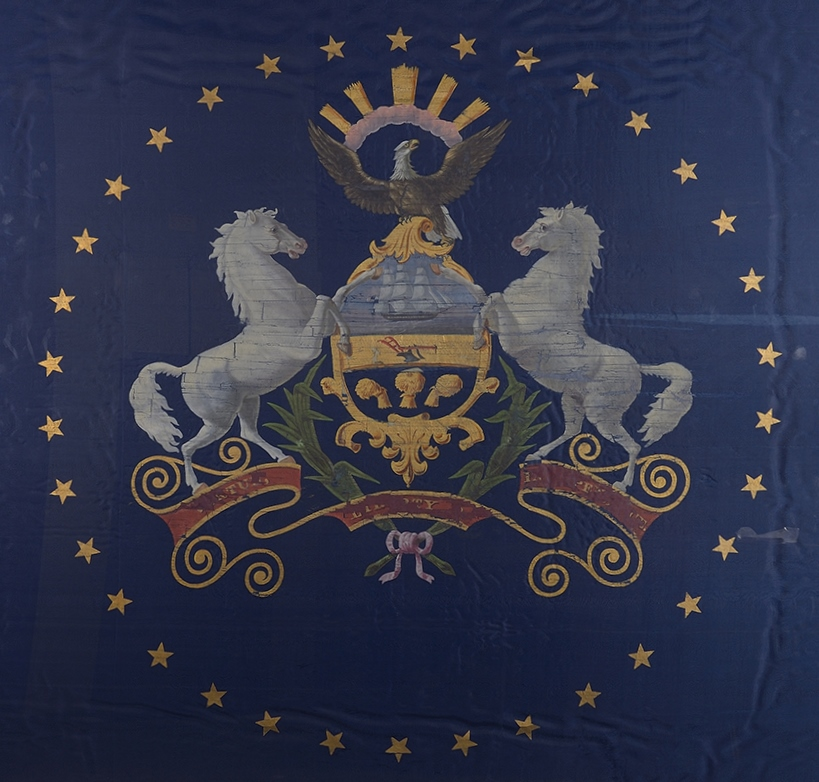
Flag of Pennsylvania
(1778 – June 13, 1907)

Flag of Rhode Island
(1877 – 1882)

Flag of Rhode Island
(1882 – November 1, 1897)

Flag of South Carolina
(January 26, 1861 – January 28, 1861)

Flag of South Dakota before first redesign
(obverse, November 9, 1909 – March 11, 1963)

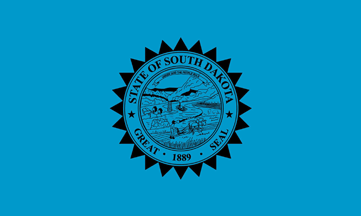
Flag of South Dakota
(reverse, November 9, 1909 – March 11, 1963)

Flag of South Dakota before second redesign
(March 11, 1963 – November 9, 1992)

Flag of Tennessee
(1897 – April 17, 1905)

Flag of Utah
(de facto, 1903 – circa 1909)

Flag of Utah
(de facto, circa 1909 – March 9, 1911)

Flag of Utah
(March 9, 1911 – March 11, 1913)

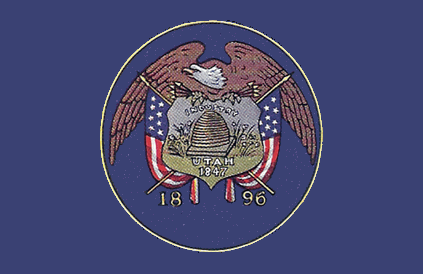
Flag of Utah
(March 11, 1913 – May 6, 1922)

Flag of Utah
(May 6, 1922 – February 16, 2011)

Flag of Utah
(February 16, 2011 – March 9, 2024)

Flag of Vermont
(May 1, 1804 – October 20, 1837)

Flag of Vermont
(October 20, 1837 – June 1, 1923)

Flag of Virginia
(1861 – 1865)

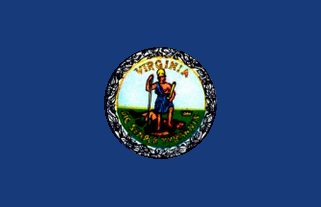
Flag of Virginia before standardization of seal
(1931 – February 1, 1950)

Flag of Virginia before first revision
(February 1, 1950 – August 22, 1986)

Flag of Virginia before second revision
(August 22, 1986 – July 1, 1997)

Flag of Virginia before third revision
(July 1, 1997 – 2006)

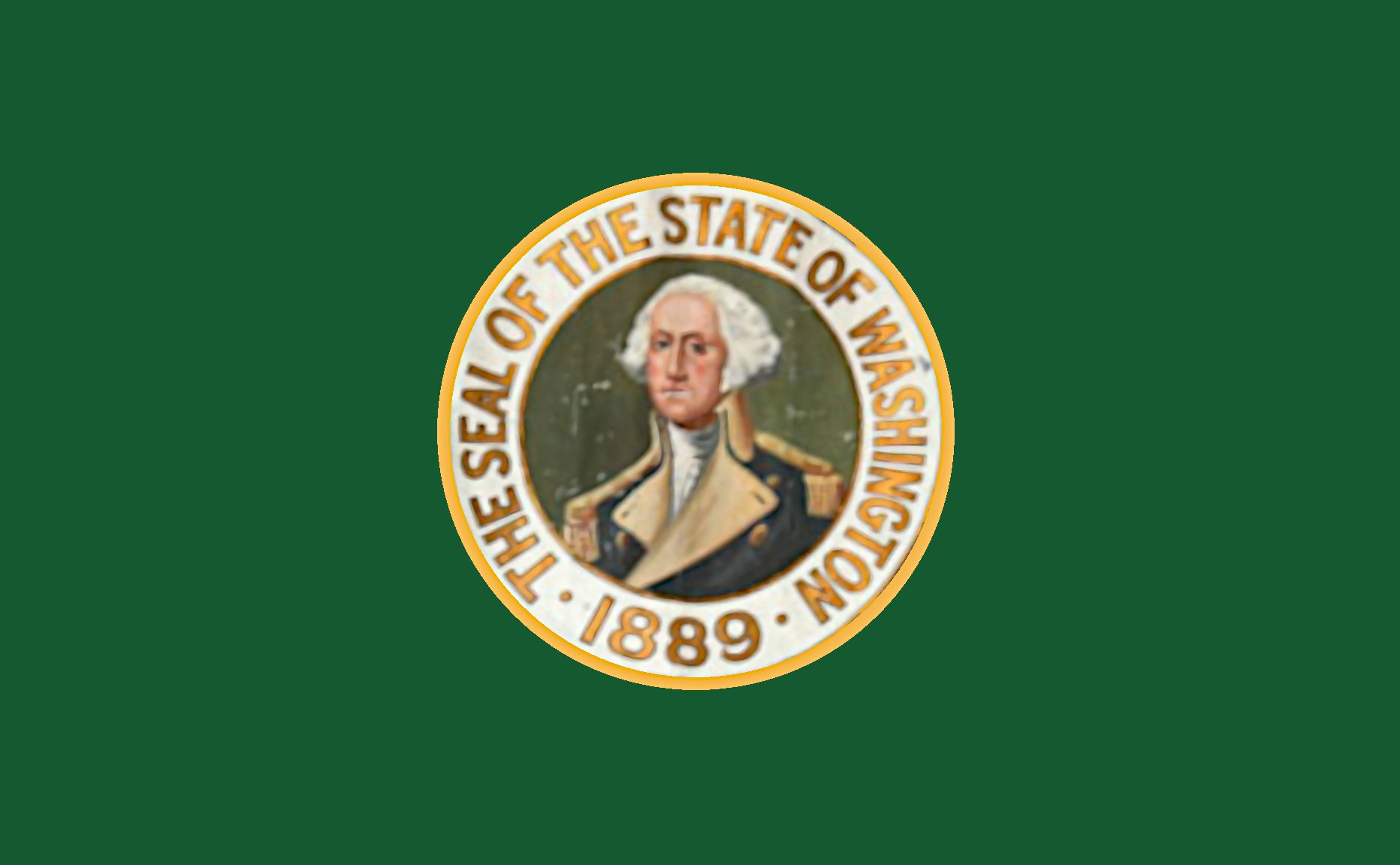
Flag of Washington before standardization of seal
(March 5, 1923 – April 1, 1967)

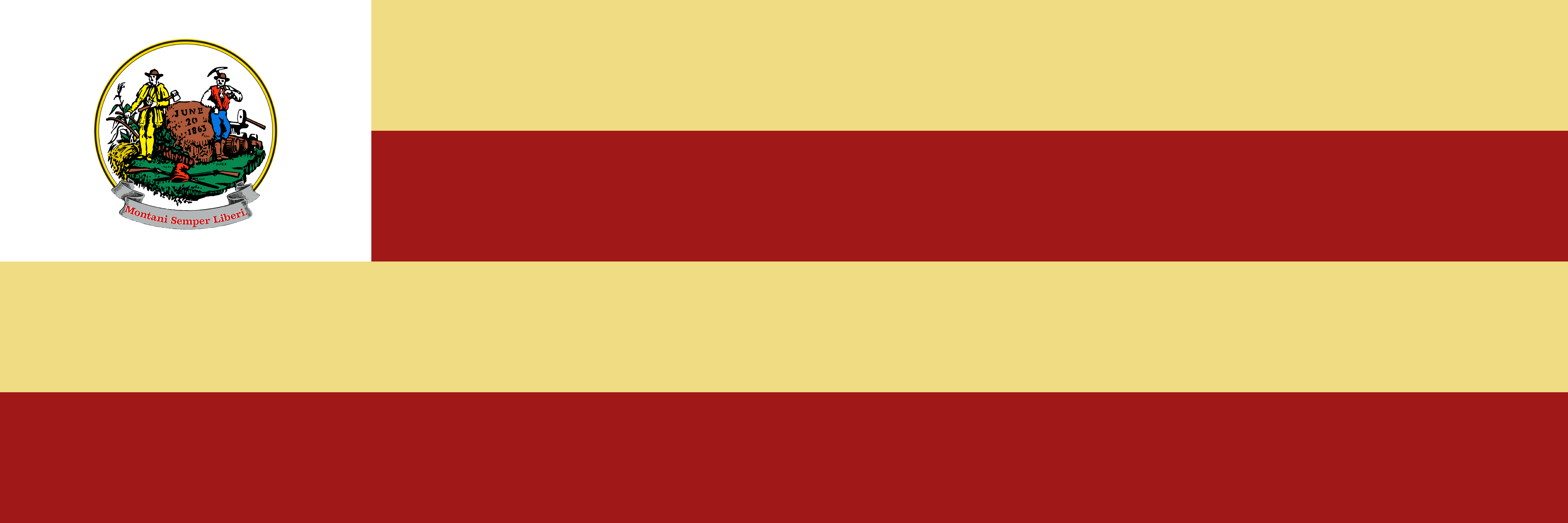
Flag of West Virginia
(1875)

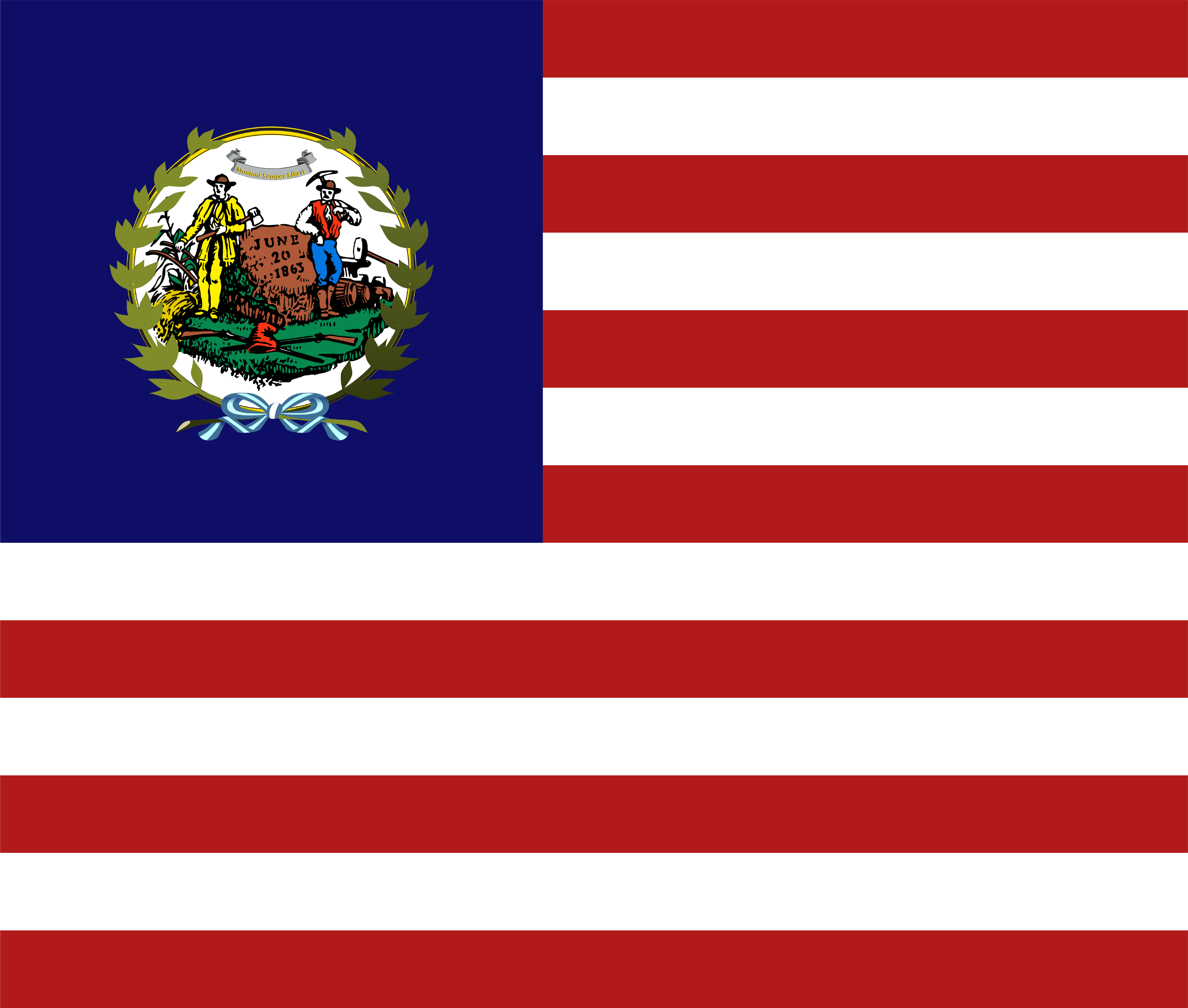
Flag of West Virginia
(1900)

Flag of West Virginia
(obverse, 1905 – 1907)

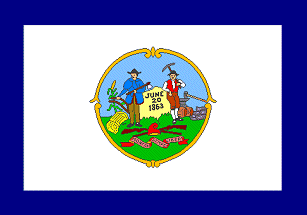
Flag of West Virginia
(reverse, 1905 – 1907)

Flag of West Virginia
(obverse, 1907 – March 7, 1929)

Flag of West Virginia
(reverse, 1907 – March 7, 1929)

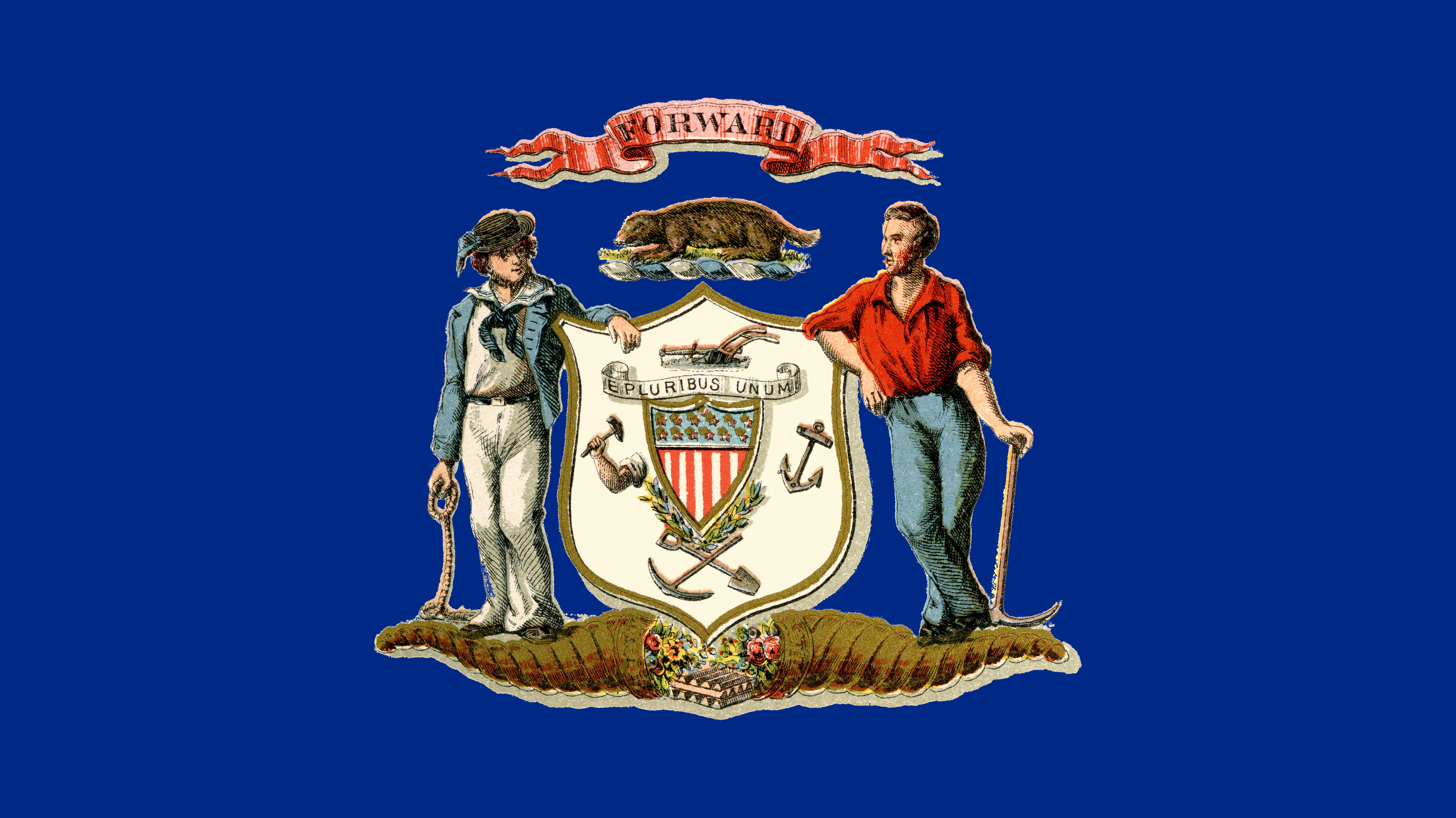
Flag of Wisconsin
(obverse, 1866 – 1913)

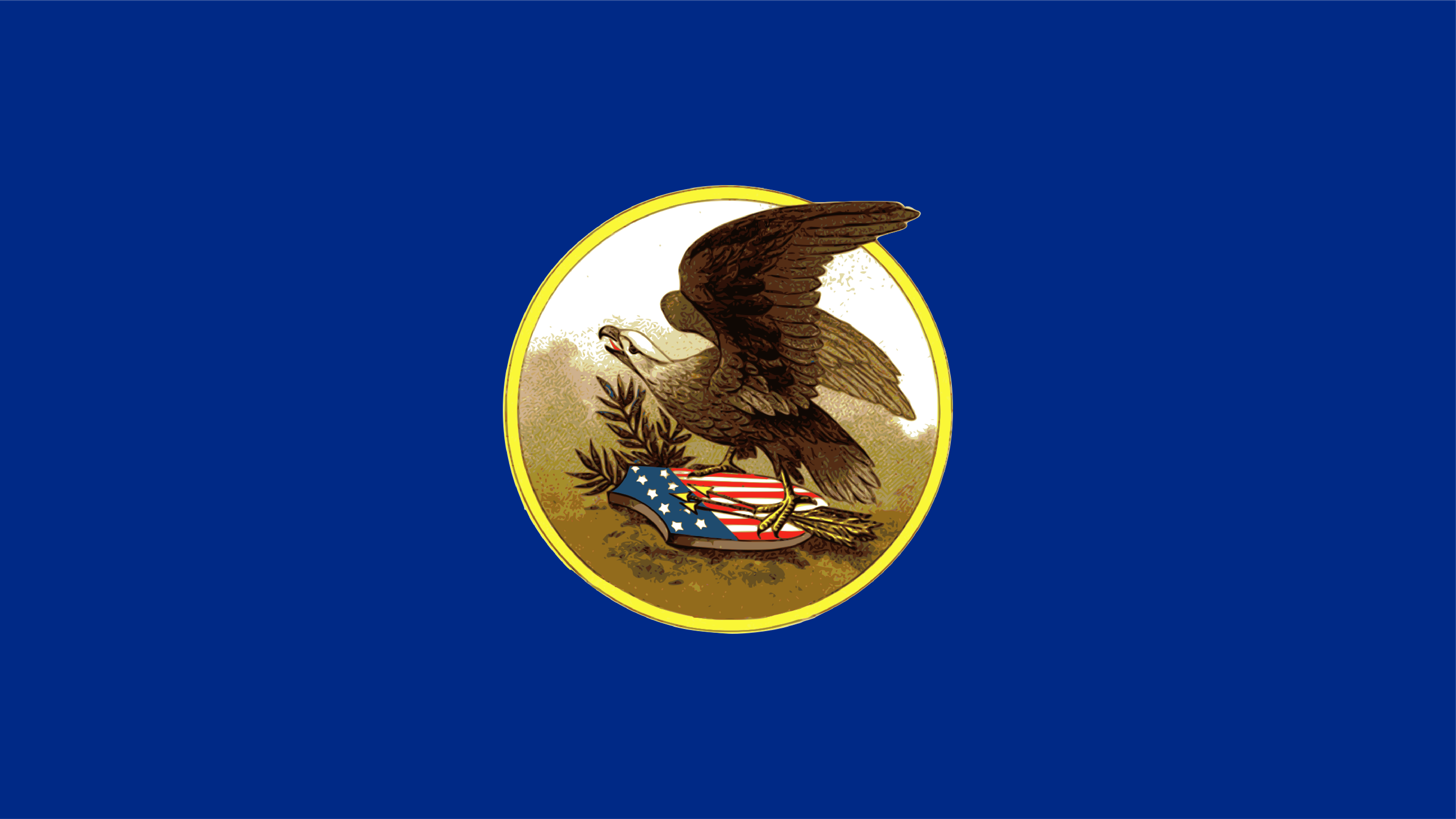
Flag of Wisconsin
(reverse, 1866 – 1913)

Flag of Wisconsin
(1913 – May 1, 1981)

=== Former territory flags ===
Flag of the Panama Canal Zone
(1915 – 1979)

Flag of the Insular Government of the Philippine Islands
(1919 – 1936)

Flag of the Commonwealth of the Philippines
(1936 – 1946)

Flag of the Trust Territory of the Pacific Islands
(1965 – 1980)

Flag of the Northern Mariana Islands
(unofficial, 1972 – 1976)
(official, 1976 – 1981)

Flag of the Northern Mariana Islands
(1981 – 1985)

Flag of Puerto Rico
(1895 – 1952)

Flag of Puerto Rico
(1952 – 1995)

=== Pre-statehood flags ===
California, Texas, and Hawaii were independent nations with flags before entering the union. The Utah Territory had a flag before receiving statehood.

Flag of California Republic
(June 14 – July 9, 1846)

Flag of Kingdom of Hawaii
(1816 – 1845)

Flag of Republic of Texas
(1836 – 1839)

Flag of Republic of Texas
(de facto, 1835 – 1839)

Flag of Republic of Texas
(1839 – 1845)

== Native American flags ==
Many Native American nations have tribal sovereignty, with jurisdiction over their members and reserved land. Although reservations are on state land, the laws of the state(s) do not necessarily apply.Moreover, According to Public Law 83-280, certain states have the right to handle court case and crimes involving Native Americans living in reservations in that state. This law also stated that although these certain states could take care of court cases involving Native American reservations, they could not control their governments, take away their hunting and fishing rights, or tax the people living inside of these reservations. Below are the flags of some of the largest Indian tribes reservations by population and area:

Flag of the Navajo Nation

Flag of Yavapai-Prescott Tribe

Flag of the Cherokee Nation

Flag of the Choctaw Nation

Flag of Chinook Nation

Flag of the Osage Nation

Flag of the Organized Village of Kake

Flag of the Puyallup Indian Reservation

flag of the Flathead Indian Reservation

Flag of the Northern Arapaho of the Wind River Indian Reservation

Flag of the Eastern Shoshone of the Wind River Indian Reservation

Flag of the Saginaw Chippewa Tribal Nation of the Isabella Indian Reservation

Flag of the Zia Pueblo

Flag of the Uintah and Ouray Indian Reservation

Flag of Chickasaw Nation

Flag of the Oneida Nation of Wisconsin

Flag of Northern Cheyenne Indian Reservation

Flag of Robinson Rancheria of Pomo Indians of California

Flag of the Pine Ridge Reservation

Flag of the Nez Perce

Flag of Ninilchik Village Tribe

Flag of Miccosukee

Flag of Sac and Fox Nation

Flag of Pascua Yaqui Tribe

Flag of Viejas Group of Capitan Grande Band of Mission Indians

Flag of the Seminole Nation

Flag of the Tohono Oʼodham Nation

Flag of the Comanche Nation

Flag of the Hopi Nation

Flag of the Ho-Chunk Nation

Flag of the Blackfeet Nation

Flag of the Colorado River Indian Tribes

Flag of the Haudenosaunee Confederacy

== Unofficial flags of United States Minor Outlying Islands ==
The U.S. national flag is the official flag for all islands, atolls, and reefs composing the United States Minor Outlying Islands. However, unofficial flags are sometimes used to represent some of these insular areas:

Johnston Atoll
(June 18, 1991 of December 7, 2001)

Midway Islands
(June 19, 1991 of June 4, 2000)

Wake Island
(April 1, 1976)

== See also ==
- Flag of the United States
- Flags of governors of the U.S. states
- List of flags of the United States (including county, city and historical flags)
- List of U.S. state, district, and territorial insignia
- Flags of the Confederate States
- Timeline of U.S. state and territory flags
- Proposed flags of U.S. states
