= Seal of Kentucky =

Official government emblem of the U.S. state of Kentucky

Seal of the Commonwealth of Kentucky
- Armiger: Commonwealth of Kentucky
- Adopted: December 1792 (standardized 1962)
- Motto: "United we stand, divided we fall"

The Seal of the Commonwealth of Kentucky was adopted in December 1792. Since that time, it has undergone several revisions. The current seal depicts two men, one in buckskin, and the other in more formal dress. The men are facing each other and clasping hands. The outer ring of the seal is adorned with the words "Commonwealth of Kentucky", and within the inner circle is the state motto "United we stand, divided we fall." The official colors of the seal are blue and gold. A version of the seal appears on the flag of Kentucky.

== History ==
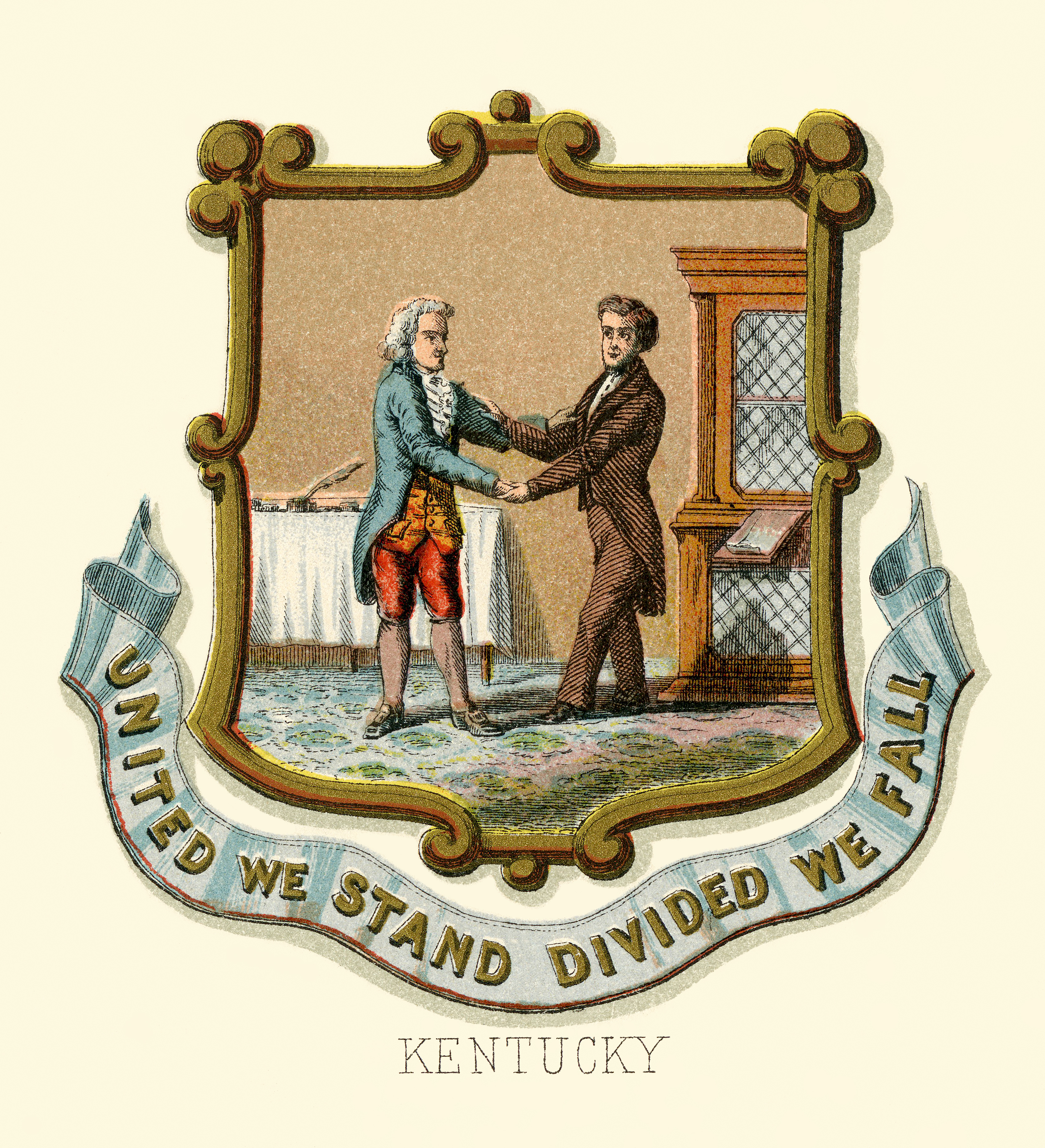
Kentucky state historical coat of arms (illustrated, 1876)

Provision for the creation of a seal for the Commonwealth was made during the first session of the Kentucky General Assembly. On December 20, 1792, the Assembly passed an act, reading: "That the Governor be empowered and is hereby required to provide at the public charge a seal for this Commonwealth; and procure the same to be engraved with the following device, viz: Two friends embracing, with the name of the state over their heads and around about the following motto: United we stand, divided we fall."

According to John Brown, Kentucky's first Senator, the original seal was to have depicted "two friends, in hunter's clothing, their right hands clasped, and their left hand resting on each other's shoulders." This depiction would represent a literal rendering of the state motto, united we stand divided we fall.. Lexington silversmith David Humphries was charged with designing the seal in 1793. Instead of hunting apparel, Humphries' version depicted two men in swallowtail coats, and instead of a handshake, the two friends share a full embrace. This original seal was destroyed in a fire that destroyed the state capitol in 1814.

Because the description originally adopted by the General Assembly does not specify what the "two friends" should look like or how they should be embracing, several variants of the state seal were created subsequent to the destruction of the original or they could show that people from " different worlds" are united as said in the motto. Different depictions of the seal have the friends outfitted in various clothing from coats and top hats to Roman togas. The embrace is shown as clasped hands, a hug, or a handshake combined with hands on one another shoulders. It has even been speculated that certain die-makers have intentionally designed strange and unnatural poses to represent that the two friends were drunk on Kentucky bourbon or were demonstrating a secret handshake or symbol from a fraternal order.

In 1857, an anonymous artist was commissioned to paint the seals of the various states in the skylights in the House of Representatives' chamber. This artist's depiction showed one man in buckskin boots and a hat and another in formal attire. The two are standing in front of a row of columns and wearing garments resembling togas as overcoats. A 1952 article in The Courier-Journal opined that "They stand in a halfhearted embrace, as if each startled the other with his gesture."

One particularly odd-looking version of the seal had one of the friends joining his left hand to the other's right, which commissioner of conservation Henry Ward said made the two appear to be dancing an Irish jig. In 1954, Ward asked Louisville native Ernie Giancola to redesign the seal. Using a neighbor as a model, Giancola created a more natural-looking handshake for the friends.

In 1962, the General Assembly further clarified the look of the seal to minimize variation in the future. They prescribed that the seal should depict "a pioneer meeting a gentleman in a swallowtail coat."

The current version of the seal was designed by artist and former mayor of Hazard, Kentucky, Nan Gorman.

== Symbolism ==
Popular belief claims that the buckskin-clad man on the left is Daniel Boone, who was largely responsible for the exploration of Kentucky, and the man in the suit on the right is Henry Clay, Kentucky's most famous statesman. However, the official explanation is that the men represent all frontiersmen and statesmen, rather than any specific persons. The motto "United we stand, divided we fall" comes from the lyrics of "The Liberty Song", a patriotic song from the American Revolution.

== Historical versions ==
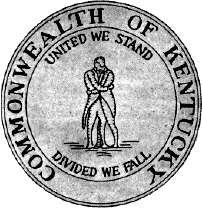
The original seal of Kentucky from a document c. 1800

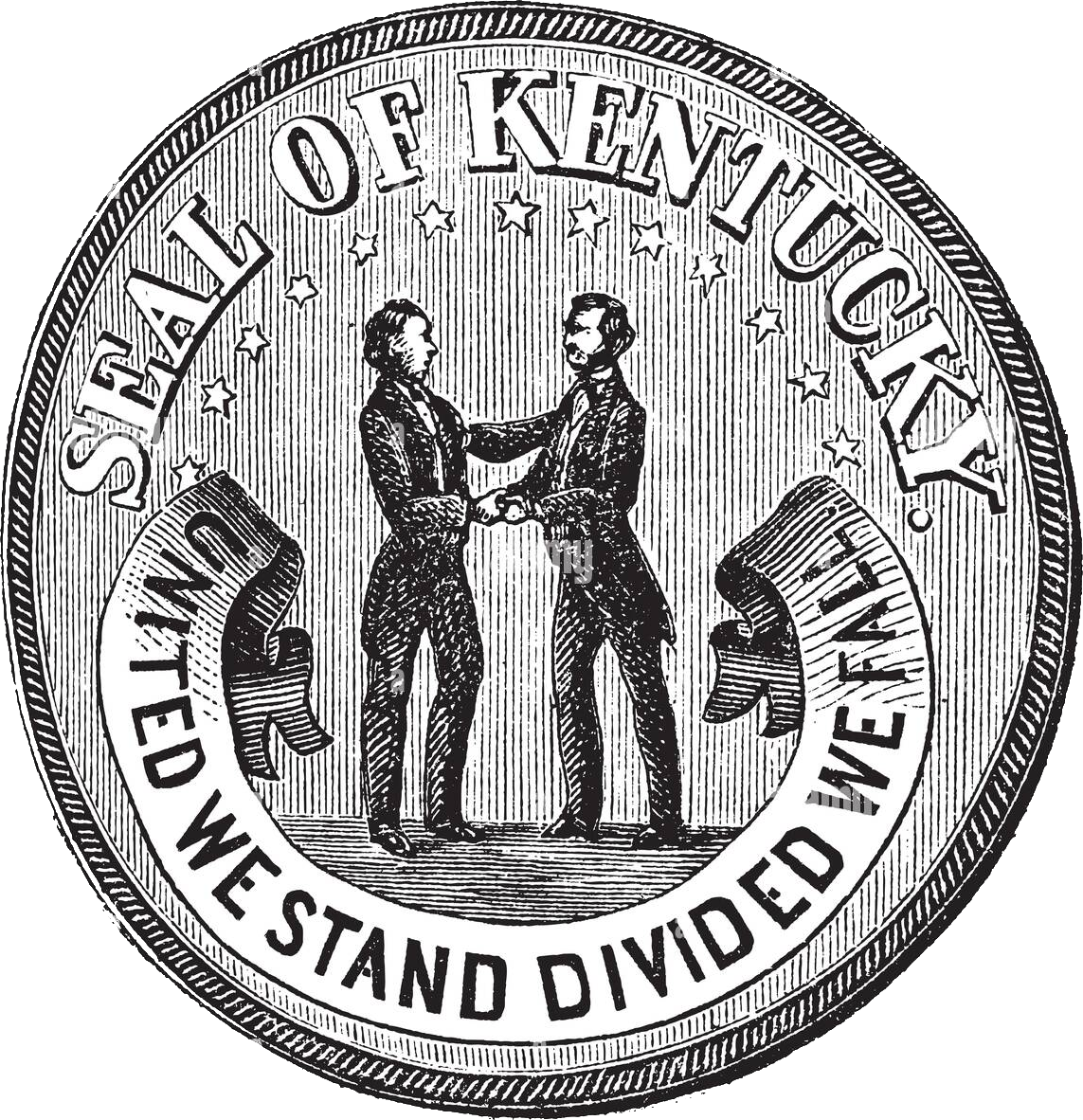
Pre-1962 state seal, from the mid-1880s.

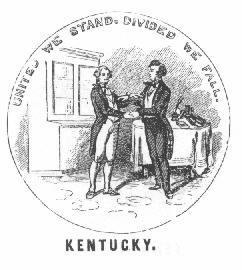
A version of the seal of Kentucky used during the Civil War

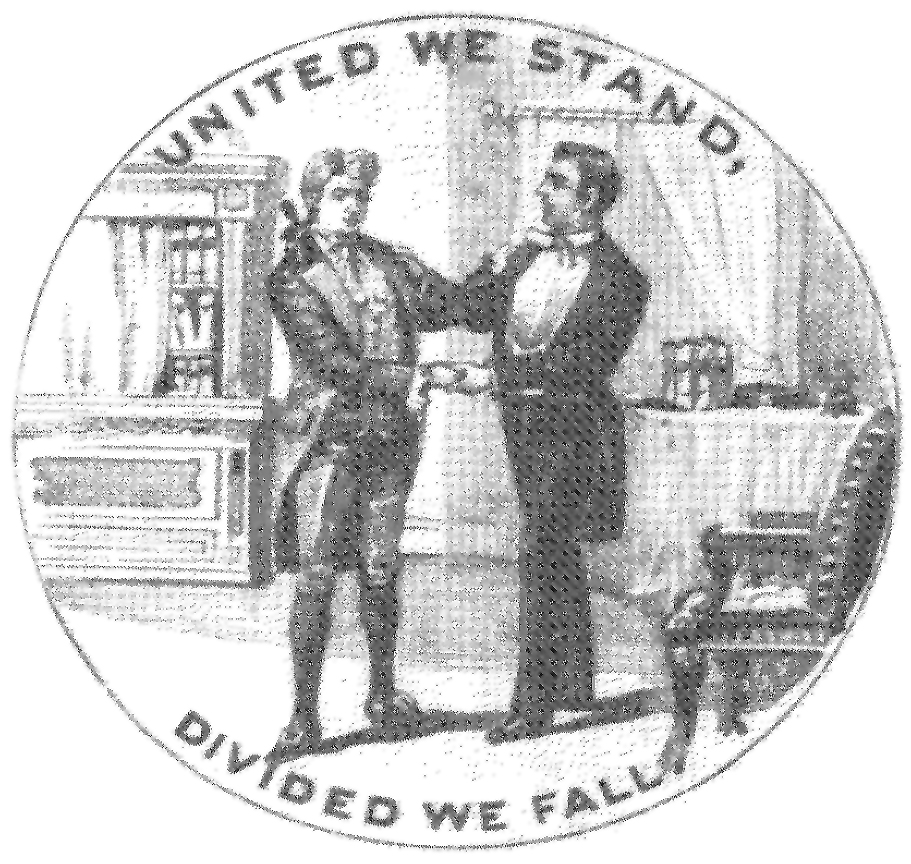
Pre-1962 state seal from the early 1900s.

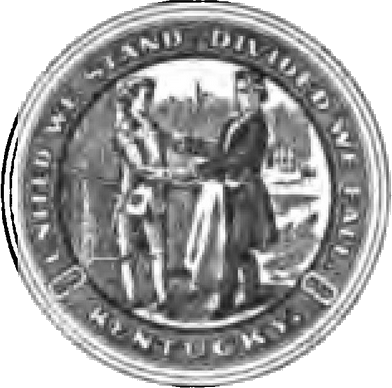
Pre-1962 state seal from the late 1900s.

Pre-1962 state seal used from the 1910s to the 1950s.

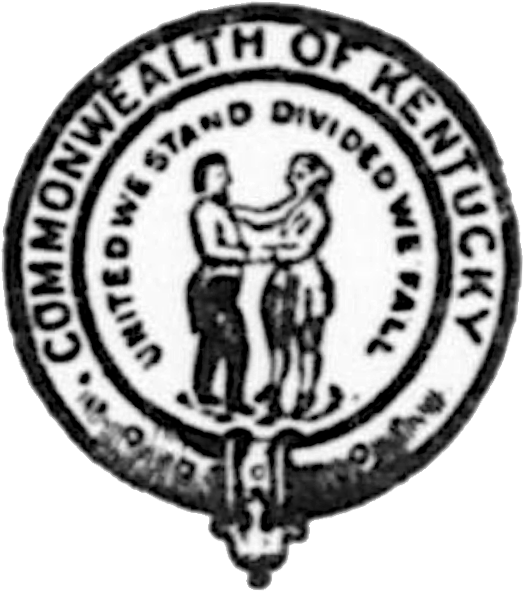
Pre-1962 state seal from the mid-1930s.

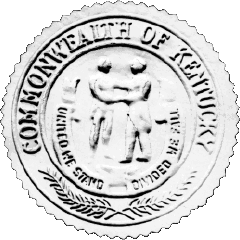
Pre-1962 seal

Seal used by the Confederate government of Kentucky during the Civil War
