= Flag of Alabama =

Flag of the U.S. state of Alabama

Alabama
- Use: Civil and state flag
- Proportion: Not specified
- Adopted: February 16, 1895; 131 years ago
- Design: A crimson cross of St. Andrew on a white field.
- Designed by: John W. A. Sanford Jr.
- Flag of the governor of Alabama
- Use: State flag
- Proportion: 2:3 (by convention)
- Design: The state flag with the state military crest and the coat of arms of Alabama in the lower and upper sections

The flag of the U.S. state of Alabama was adopted by Act 383 of the Alabama Legislature on February 16, 1895, following the introduction of the bill by its designer, Representative John W. A. Sanford Jr. Its design features a crimson cross of St. Andrew on a field of white. A St. Andrew's cross, a diagonal cross known in vexillology as a saltire, represents the cross on which St. Andrew was crucified.

== Statute ==
The Alabama state flag is defined by law as:

"The flag of the State of Alabama shall be a crimson cross of St. Andrew on a field of white. The bars forming the cross shall be not less than six inches broad, and must extend diagonally across the flag from side to side." – (Code 1896, §3751; Code 1907, §2058; Code 1923, §2995; Code 1940, T. 55, §5.)

Because the bars must be at least six inches (150 mm) wide, small representations of the Alabama flag do not meet the legal definition.

== History ==
=== 1860 authorization of a state flag ===
In 1860, the Alabama Legislature passed a military bill (Act No. 45) to organize a volunteer militia. Section 17 of the act empowered a military commission to adopt a state flag. No specific design is known to have been chosen.

=== Secession Convention flag ===
Secession Convention flag, 1861 (obverse), per description

Secession Convention flag, 1861 (reverse), per description

On January 11, 1861, Alabama formally declared its withdrawal from the Union in the Declaration of Secession. On the same day, a flag was presented to Alabama Secession Convention in Montgomery, where the Convention passed a resolution designating it as the official flag of the body, to be flown whenever the convention was in open session. The flag was sewn and designed by several women from Montgomery, with much of its painting done by Francis Corra, a painter specializing in military and decorative banners. William L. Yancey presented the flag to the convention with an emotional speech.

Contemporary descriptions recorded its appearance. The Atlanta Intelligencer reported on January 14 that the banner was made of blue silk, and bordered with white. On January 16, a Montgomery Weekly Advertiser reporter described the flag as one side depicting the Goddess of Liberty holding an unsheathed sword in her right hand and a single-star flag in her left, with the inscription "Alabama — Independent Now and Forever" in an arch above all. The reverse featured a cotton plant with a rattlesnake coiled at its base, the words "Noli Me Tangere", ("Touch Me Not" in Latin) above, and the Coat of Arms of Alabama.

Detailing its intended symbolism are extracts from Yancey's speech, where it is written that the design featured the Goddess of Liberty, "with a sword drawn to defend her rights," a cotton plant to represent the source of the nation's wealth, and a rattlesnake, "coiled to manifest our determination to defend our rights. It is coiled because ours is not an aggressive position. The rattlesnake is peaceable and harmless until disturbed; but death to the individual who assaults it."

The flag was flown until February 10, 1861, when it was removed after it had been left flying overnight and was torn. It was delivered to the Governor to be placed in the state archives and was never flown again. Following the Federal occupation of Montgomery by Union forces in 1865, the flag was taken to Iowa, where it remained until it was returned to the Alabama state archives in 1939. A photograph from a 1939 newspaper article shows the flag's damaged condition at the time of its return.

Since its reappearance in 1939, this flag has often been incorrectly referred to as the "Republic of Alabama Flag." However, no official flag was ever adopted for the short-lived "Republic." The flag carried by the Goddess of Liberty in the secession-convention banner, featuring a blue field with a gold star and the state's name in gold, has also been referred to by this name.

This flag is depicted on the flag of Mobile, Alabama.

A flag with a similar motif remained in use from February 1861 to April 1862 by the 1st Alabama Infantry, at which time it was taken into Union possession following the capture of the regiment.

=== Single star flags ===
Around 1861, a number of unofficial flags featuring a single star were flown in Alabama and were commonly referred to as 'state flags,' even though no official design had been adopted. One example is the Young Men's Secession Association flag, considered in a 1861 New York Times article as the "flag of Alabama pro tempore".

=== Current flag ===
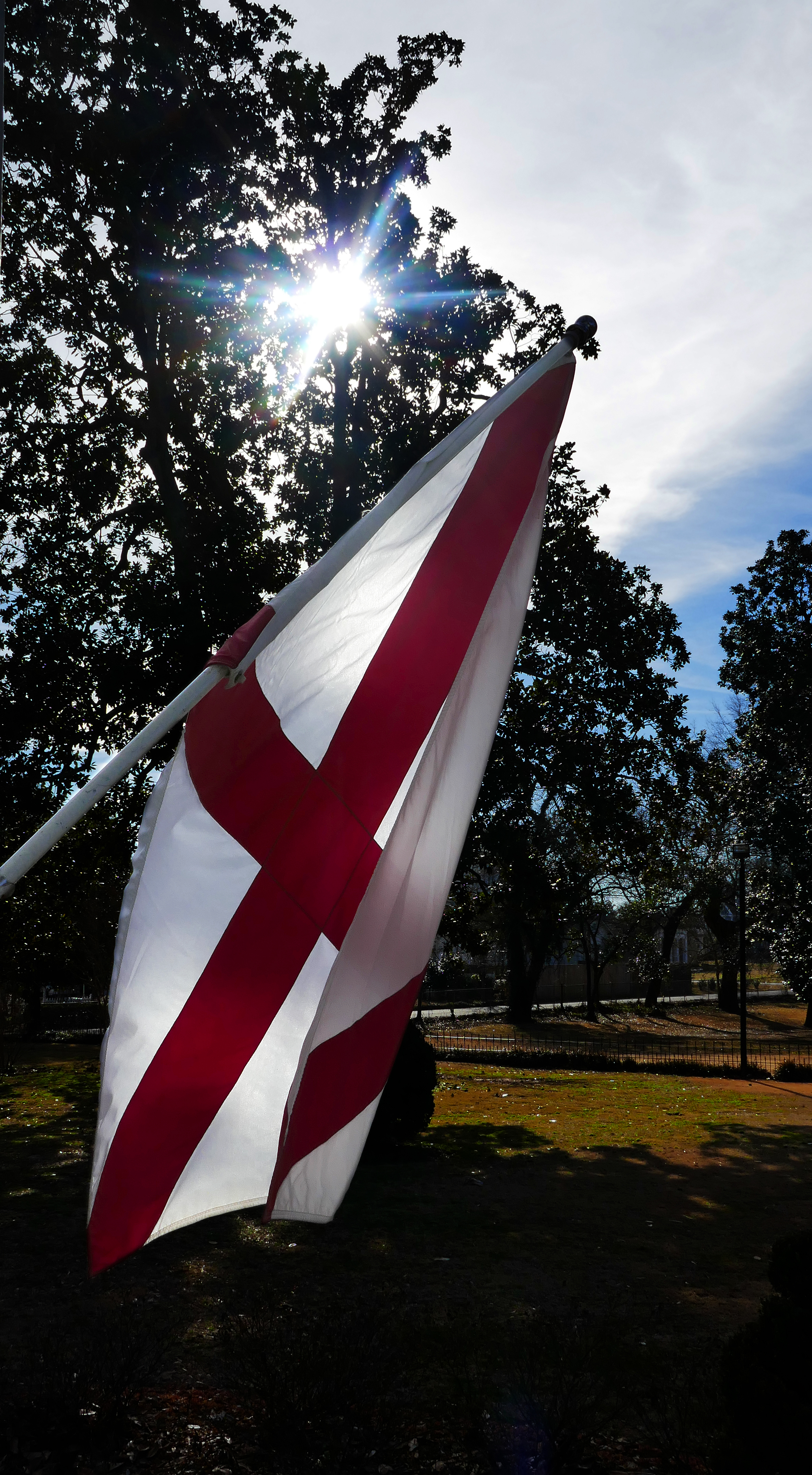
The Alabama state flag displayed at Ivy Green, Helen Keller's birthplace in Tuscumbia

The Alabama state flag with a square shape

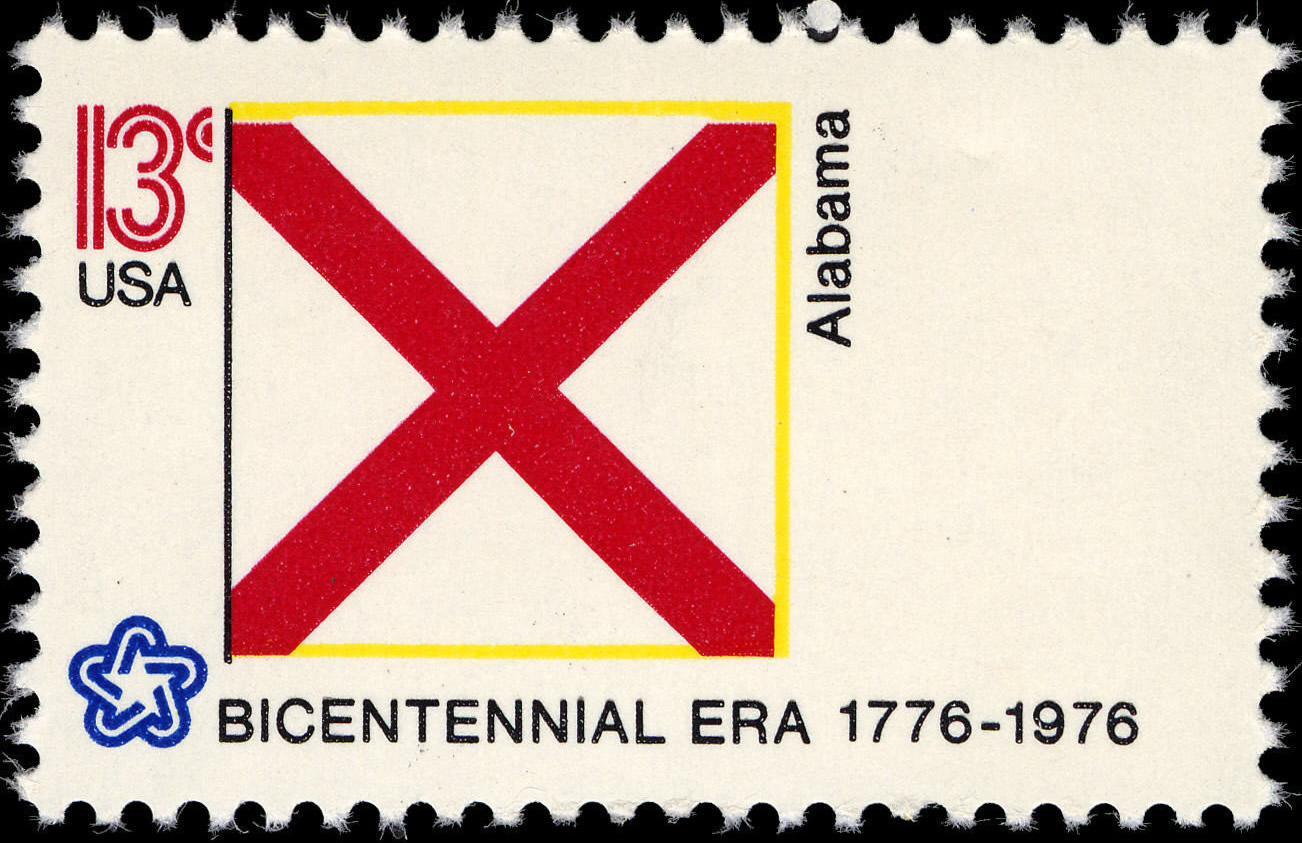
The Alabama state flag as depicted in the 1976 bicentennial postage stamp series

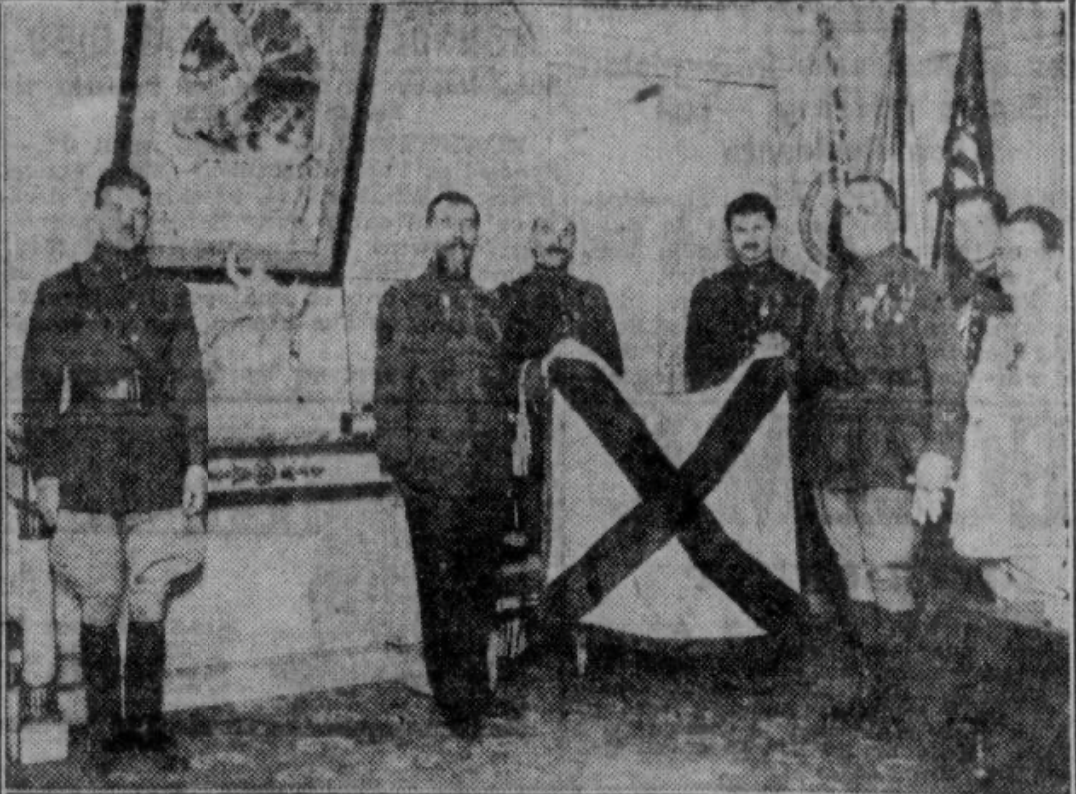
State flag presented at the American Embassy in Paris, 1925

When the bill to adopt the flag was introduced by John W. A. Sanford Jr., it was accompanied by a physical example of the proposed flag referred to in later accounts as "the design submitted" or "the first Alabama state flag—the model". A 1924 source reports that this model was made by Sanford's wife. The model was later lost, leaving historians to rely on the bill's textual description and related accounts to infer the intended appearance of the flag. The same 1924 source asserts that Sanford designed the flag with suggestions from his father, John W. A. Sanford Sr., who died in 1870. Thereby implying that aspects of the design may have been conceived decades before the flag's official adoption.

The legislation that established the state flag on February 16, 1895, did not specify whether the flag should be square or rectangular. In 1987, the office of Alabama Attorney General Don Siegelman stated in a letter that the proper shape of the state flag is rectangular, as it had been depicted numerous times in official publications and reproductions. Despite this, the flag is still often depicted as being square, even in official publications of the U.S. federal government. A widely seen example of the square flag is in the logo of the Alabama Historical Association, which appears on all historical markers erected by the association, making it visible throughout the state.

More than a decade after its adoption, the flag was described as little known among Alabamians. At the time, few U.S. states had their own flags, and the idea of a distinct state flag was still relatively new. Before the adoption of the state flag, the United States flag was used for all official occasions following the end of the Civil War.

The flag of Alabama is similar to the flag of Florida. However, Alabama adopted its flag design in 1895, five years earlier than Florida. In 1900, Florida revised its state flag by adding a red saltire, making the flag visually similar to Alabama's flag and suggesting a possible connection. The leading theories, however, hold that the design instead draws inspiration from either the Confederate Battle Flag or the Cross of Burgundy, which represented Spanish Florida from the 16th to 18th centuries. Although one commentator has suggested a direct link to Alabama's flag, there is no clear evidence connecting Alabama's 1895 flag to Florida's red bars in 1900, and no one has provided definitive proof showing why Florida added the red bars to its state flag.

In 2001, a survey conducted by the North American Vexillological Association ranked Alabama's state flag 29th in design quality of the 72 Canadian provincial, U.S. state and U.S. territorial flags.

== Theories on origin ==
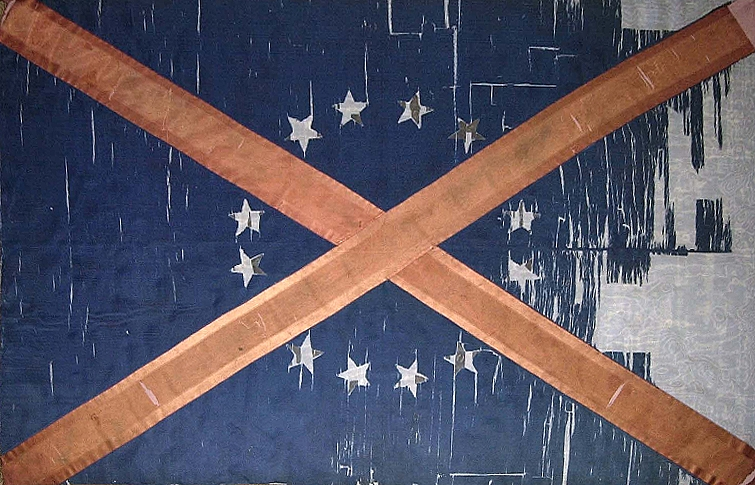
The Hilliard's Legion flag

The inspiration for Alabama's flag is not known. Many have noted that the saltire was commonly used on flags of the Confederate States of America. No documentation in the legislative records indicates that the Alabama flag was intended to commemorate the Confederacy. Still, various people have asserted over the decades that the design was drawn from the Confederate battle flag.

The adoption of Alabama's state flag received minimal attention in the press. While no article explained the flag's symbolism, a Montgomery Advertiser piece from February 8, 1895, attributed its adoption to "[a] wave of patriotism" and noted it alongside two other legislative efforts: one establishing state holidays for Jefferson Davis and Robert E. Lee, and another creating a state seal honoring Emma Sansom's role in helping Confederate General Nathan Bedford Forrest capture Union Colonel Abel Streight and his troops.

In 1900, the Montgomery Advertiser reported the flag was "a memory and a suggestion of the Confederate battle flag". In 1906, a piece in the Birmingham Age-Herald made no specific connection between the Alabama flag and the Confederate battle flag, instead describing only the symbolic history of the St. Andrew's cross itself. In 1915, Thomas M. Owen, the first director of the Alabama Department of Archives and History, wrote that the flag bill's sponsor and the rest of the legislature had intended to "preserve, in permanent form, some of the more distinctive features of the Confederate battle flag". Several sources have since quoted his words, one such example being a 1917 article in National Geographic.

During a public ceremony held in the World War Memorial Building on Flag Day, June 14, 1940, Mrs. Albert J. Pickett, President of the Cradle of the Confederacy Chapter, United Daughters of the Confederacy, said that the lawmakers who adopted the State Flag in 1895 had chosen the form of the Confederate battle flag as the state emblem out of their veneration for the heroes of the Confederacy and the history made by soldiers under that banner, adding that the legislative body would have adopted the battle flag in full as the state flag had the neighboring state of Mississippi not already done so.

In 1924, Bell Allen Ross, a member of the Daughters of the Confederacy, said that Rep. John W. A. Sanford Jr. modeled his design of the Alabama flag on the battle flag used by his father, John W. A. Sanford, while commanding the Hilliard's Legion regiment. Using the words of Thomas M. Owen, she said that Sanford's design was meant to preserve some of the distinctive features of the Confederate battle flag, particularly the Saint Andrew's Cross, but also added that the colors were chosen to represent purity and purpose (white) and courage (red).

In a 1987 letter, Alabama Attorney General Don Siegelman wrote that the flag was modeled after Sanford's 60th Alabama Infantry Regiment battle flag.

More recent commentators note that the Alabama flag was adopted during a period of promotion of the "Lost Cause" of the culture of the antebellum South. Other former Confederate slave states, beginning with Mississippi, and followed by Florida, had also adopted new state flags around the same time that they disenfranchised African Americans and passed laws establishing Jim Crow segregation.

But other contemporary commentators, such as Steve Murray, Director of the Alabama Department of History and Archives, believe the origins of the flag are unclear. According to Murray, the flag's connections to the battle flag are thin and based on suppositions. Murray said, "I would conclude that if they were wanting to evoke the Confederate battle flag, they would have been more explicit about doing it either in the design which could have more closely resembled the Confederate flag." Murray also noted that Alabama may have wanted to approve a new state flag to prepare for an exposition in Atlanta, Georgia, later that year.

== Other flags ==
=== Governor's flag ===
The flag of the governor of Alabama is a variant of the state flag. In the top saltire, the flag displays the state coat of arms. The bottom saltire contains the state military crest, which consists of a cotton plant with full bursting boll.

Flag of the Governor since 1939

Flag of the Governor before 1939

=== Anniversary flags ===
Alabama statehood or exclusionary flag, circa 1830 or 1861–1863

Alabama Centennial flag, made in 1919 by Mrs. Idyl King Sorsby to celebrate 100 years of statehood

Alabama Sesquicentennial Flag, designed in 1969 to mark Alabama's 150th anniversary of statehood

Alabama Bicentennial Flag, designed in 2019 to mark Alabama's 200th anniversary of statehood

=== Unofficial flags ===
After the state flag was adopted, there were some unofficial flags bearing the coat of arms being used. In 1896, delegates from the state went to Indianapolis to support presidential candidate Grover Cleveland. The men carried with them a purple banner with the coat of arms in the middle with the words "Here we rest" below.

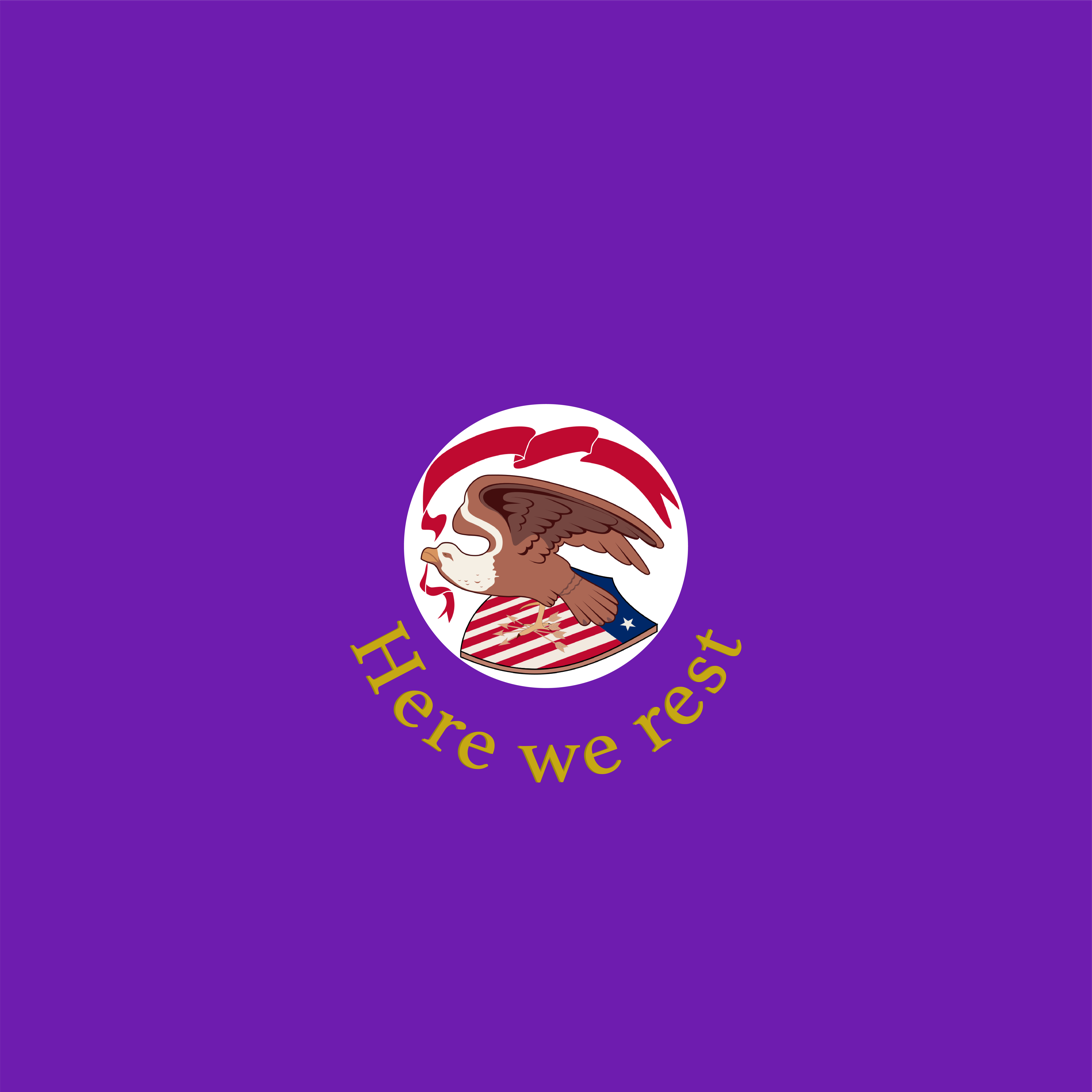
Digital reconstruction of the banner carried by state delegates during the 1896 Democratic National Convention.

Digital reconstruction of the Alabama cavalry squadron flag, 1902

During the Spanish-American War, the state organized the 1st Regiment Alabama Volunteers to be stationed in Florida. The regiment carried two flags, one was a unique American flag with red, white, and blue stripes with the name of the regiment embroidered on the stripes. The other flag had a blue field with the state's coat of arms in the center. It was painted by Jackson Halstead.

In 1902, the city of Birmingham held a large parade made up of the state cavalry troops. During the march they carried with them a silk flag with a yellow field bearing the coat of arms in the center.

== See also ==
- List of Alabama state symbols
- Seal of Alabama
- Saint Patrick's Saltire
- Spanish Empire
