= Coat of arms of New York =

U.S. state coat of arms

Coat of arms of the State of New York

Versions
- Great Seal of the State of New York
- Armiger: State of New York
- Adopted: 1882, modified 1896, 1901, and 2020
- Crest: An American eagle with wings displayed, surmounting a globe displaying the Atlantic hemisphere
- Shield: Azure, in a landscape, the sun in fess, rising in splendor a river, bordered below by a grassy shore fringed with shrubs, all proper.
- Supporters: Liberty and Justice
- Motto: Excelsior; E Pluribus Unum

Flag of the State of New York
- Use: Civil and state flag
- Proportion: 1:2
- Adopted: April 2, 1901; 125 years ago (modified in April 2020)
- Design: A state coat of arms on a blue field.
- Flag of the governor of New York
- Use: State flag
- Proportion: 3:5

The coat of arms of the U.S. state of New York was formally adopted in 1778, and appears as a component of the state's flag and seal.

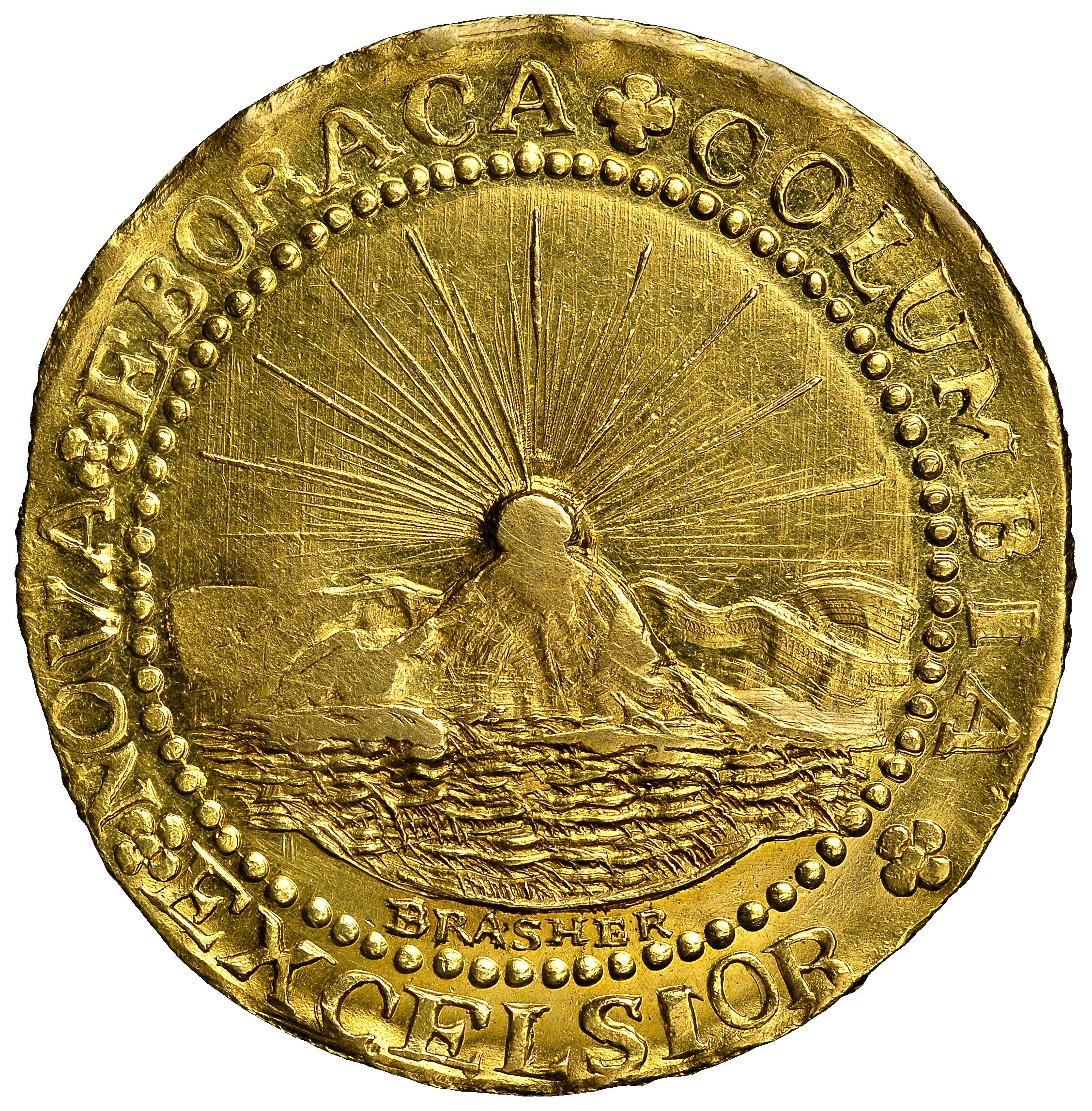
Arms of New York on the 1787 Brasher Doubloon coin.

The shield displays a masted ship and a sloop on the Hudson River (symbols of inland and foreign commerce), bordered by a grassy shore and a mountain range in the background with the smiling sun rising behind it. The unheraldic nature of the Hudson River landscape reveals the modern origin of the design.

The shield has two supporters:

- Left: Liberty, with the Revolutionary imagery of a Phrygian cap raised on a pole. Her left foot treads upon a crown, representing the state's independence from the British monarchy that ruled colonial New York.
- Right: Justice, wearing a blindfold (representing impartiality) and holding scales (representing fairness) and the sword of justice.

A banner below the shield shows the motto Excelsior, a Latin word meaning "higher", "superior", "lordly", commonly translated as "Ever Upward." Following the adoption of the 2021 State Budget in April 2020, a secondary motto, E pluribus unum, appears.

Flags bearing the pre-2020 coat of arms (i.e. without the motto E pluribus unum) are still widely used and de facto valid, so long as serviceable.

The shield is surmounted by a crest consisting of an eagle surmounting a world globe.

The flag of New York is the coat of arms on a solid blue background and the state seal of New York is the coat of arms surrounded by the words "The Great Seal of the State of New York." It is one of nine U.S. state flags to feature an eagle, alongside those of Illinois, Iowa, Michigan, Missouri, North Dakota, Oregon, Pennsylvania and Wyoming.

== Blazon ==
The official blazon for the coat of arms is:

Charge. Azure, in a landscape, the sun in fess, rising in splendor or, behind a range of three mountains, the middle one the highest; in base a ship and sloop under sail, passing and about to meet on a river, bordered below by a grassy shore fringed with shrubs, all proper.

Crest. On a wreath azure and or, an American eagle proper, rising to the Dexter from a two-thirds of a globe terrestrial, showing the north Atlantic ocean with outlines of its shores.

Supporters. On a quasi compartment formed by the extension of the scroll.

Dexter. The figure of Liberty proper, her hair disheveled and decorated with pearls, vested azure, sandaled gules, about the waist a cincture or, fringed gules, a mantle of the last depending from the shoulders behind to the feet, in the dexter hand a staff ensigned with a Phrygian cap or, the sinister arm embowed, the hand supporting the shield at the dexter chief point, a royal crown by her sinister foot dejected.

Sinister. The figure of Justice proper, her hair disheveled and decorated with pearls, vested or, about the waist a cincture azure, fringed gules, sandaled and mantled as Liberty, bound about the eyes with a fillet proper, in the dexter hand a straight sword hilted or, erect, resting on the sinister chief point of the shield, the sinister arm embowed, holding before her scales proper.

Motto. On a scroll below the shield argent, in sable, two lines. On line one, Excelsior and on line two, E pluribus unum.

== Interpretation ==
According to Joseph Gavit in New York History, Volume XXXI, the seal symbolizes the following:

- In the center, a shield reveals the sun rising behind Mount Beacon over the Hudson River. "The shield symbolizes in the full sun the name and idea of Old York and the old world; the mountains, river and meadow, with the ships, convey the name and idea of New York in the new world."
- To the right, Justice is ready to fight tyranny with her sword held high.
- Liberty, on the left, holds her foot on the overthrown English crown. "This New York is supported by Justice and Liberty, and discards monarchy."
- The world globe is displayed above the shield. "By exhibiting the eastern and western continents on the globe, the old and new are brought together;"
- Above the world globe soars the eagle. "while the eagle on the crest proclaims," Westward the course of empire takes its way."
- The bottom ribbon exclaims "Excelsior", which means "still higher" or "ever upward".

== History ==
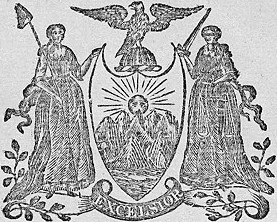
Late 18th century rendition of New York's coat of arms, using a semi-globe and rounded shield.

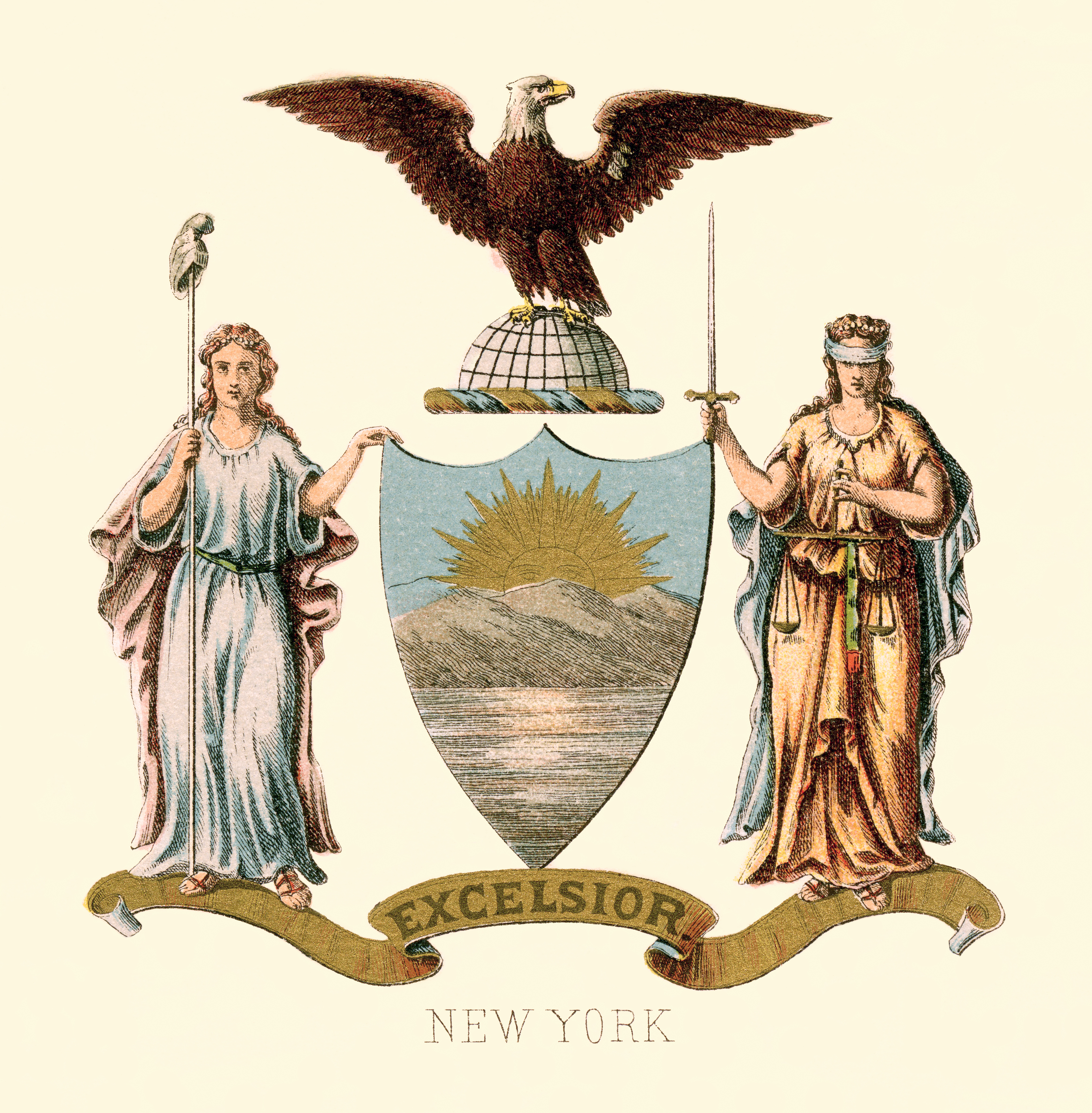
Late 19th century rendition of New York's coat of arms, using a semi-globe and rounded shield.

Coat of arms of New York from 1896 until the addition of second motto in 2020.

The first version of the coat of arms on the state flag was adopted in 1778 and has been slightly redesigned over the years. The present flag itself is a contemporary variant of an American Revolutionary War-era flag. The original is at the Albany Institute of History & Art.

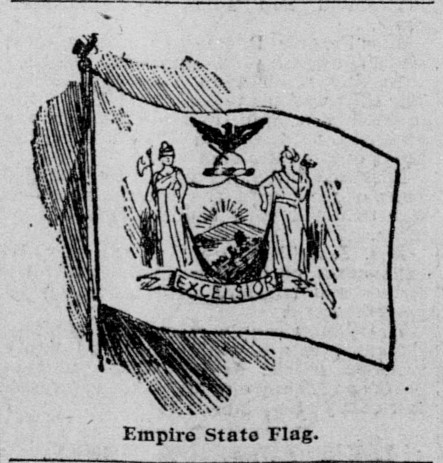
Etching of the 1896 state flag

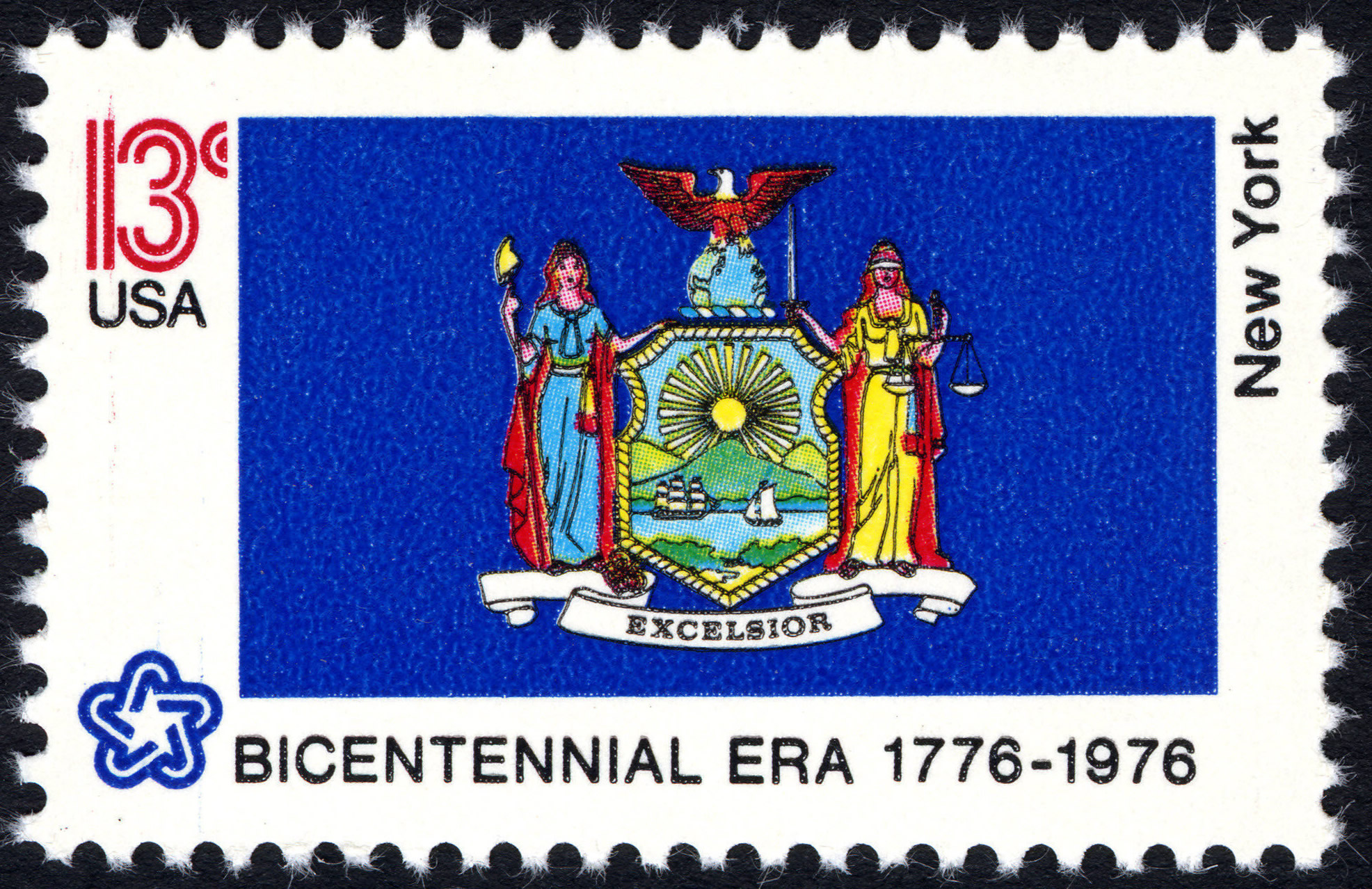
The New York state flag as depicted in the 1976 bicentennial postage stamp series

The flag was not well defined at first, but variations of a flag with the state's coat of arms have existed since 1777. In 1823, in New York City a huge party was thrown after the construction of the Erie Canal reached the Niagara Escarpment. Inside City Hall, on top a large marble slab was a state flag bearing a white silk field with the state coat of arms painted in the middle.

Other mentions of a state flag were by The New York Herald in 1853 & 1856. In 1858 the Adjutant General's office issued that the state flag features the state's coat of arms over a white background. In 1876, the state militia was ordered to change the colors of their regimental flags, with the artillery flags featuring the coat of arms on a yellow field while Infantry carried a flag with the coat of arms on a blue background.

The flag was later mentioned in a state law in 1882. On March 16, 1888 Mayor Hewitt of New York City ordered that the state flag should fly over City Hall on St. Patrick's Day. The flag was formally adopted by the state legislature in 1896 featuring a buff background since George Washington mandated regiments from New York and New Jersey wear buff facings. However, this choice of color for the flag proved unpopular in New York as it was the custom for military flags to be blue with the coat of arms, as they had been for New York troops during and before the Civil War. The legislature changed the field of the flag from buff to blue by a law enacted on April 2, 1901.

In April 2020, the 2021 state budget was passed, modifying the coat of arms to include "E Pluribus Unum" as a secondary motto beneath "Excelsior". The state seal and flag were also updated to reflect the change.

Historical state flags of New York
State flag from 1858 to 1896

State flag from 1896 to 1901

State flag from 1901 to 2020

== Other flags ==
Dutch colonial flag of New Netherland from 1614 to 1667

British colonial flag of the Province of New York from 1664 to 1783

Flag of the Port Authority of New York and New Jersey

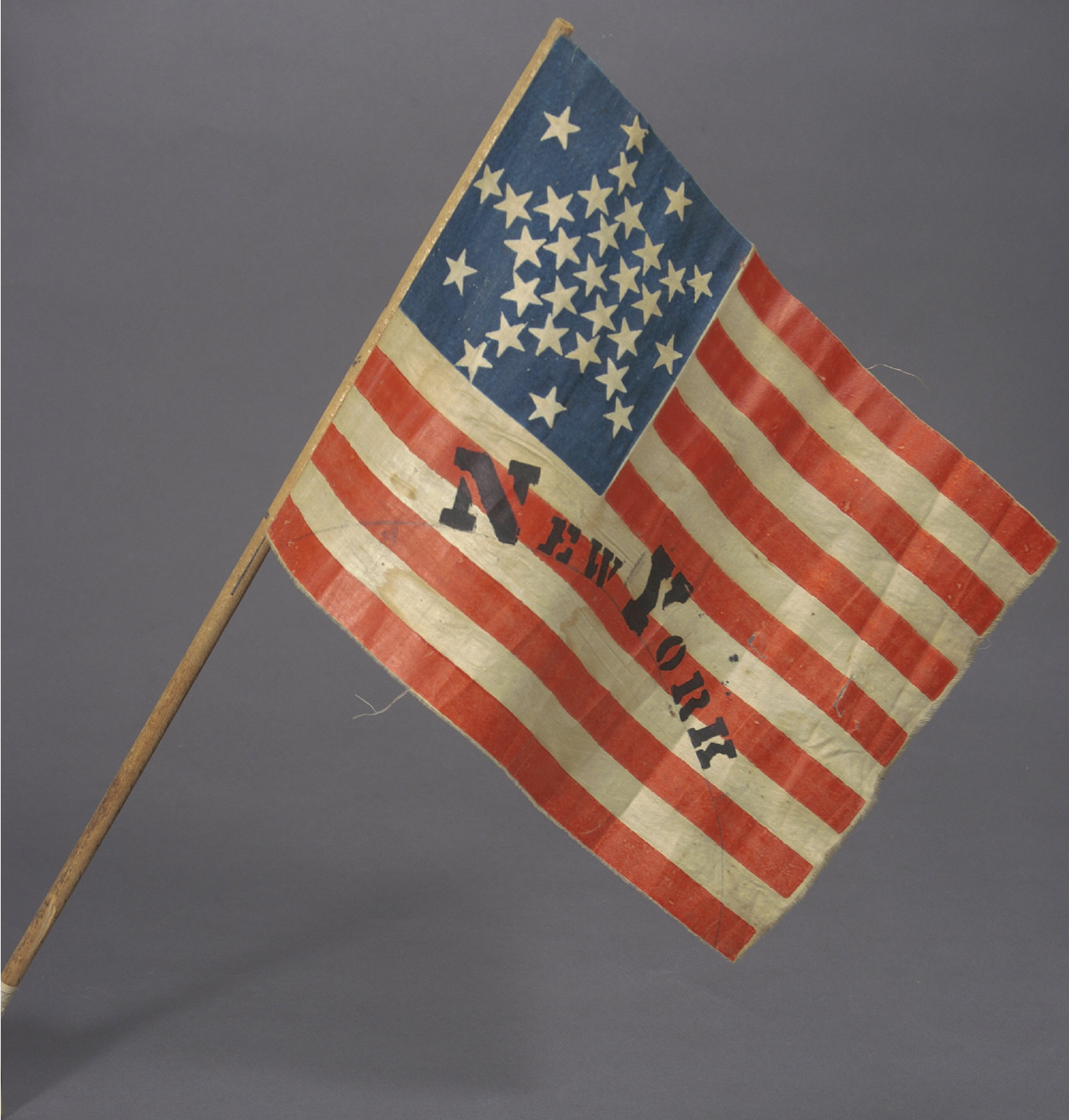
31-star American flag bearing the state's name in the stripes

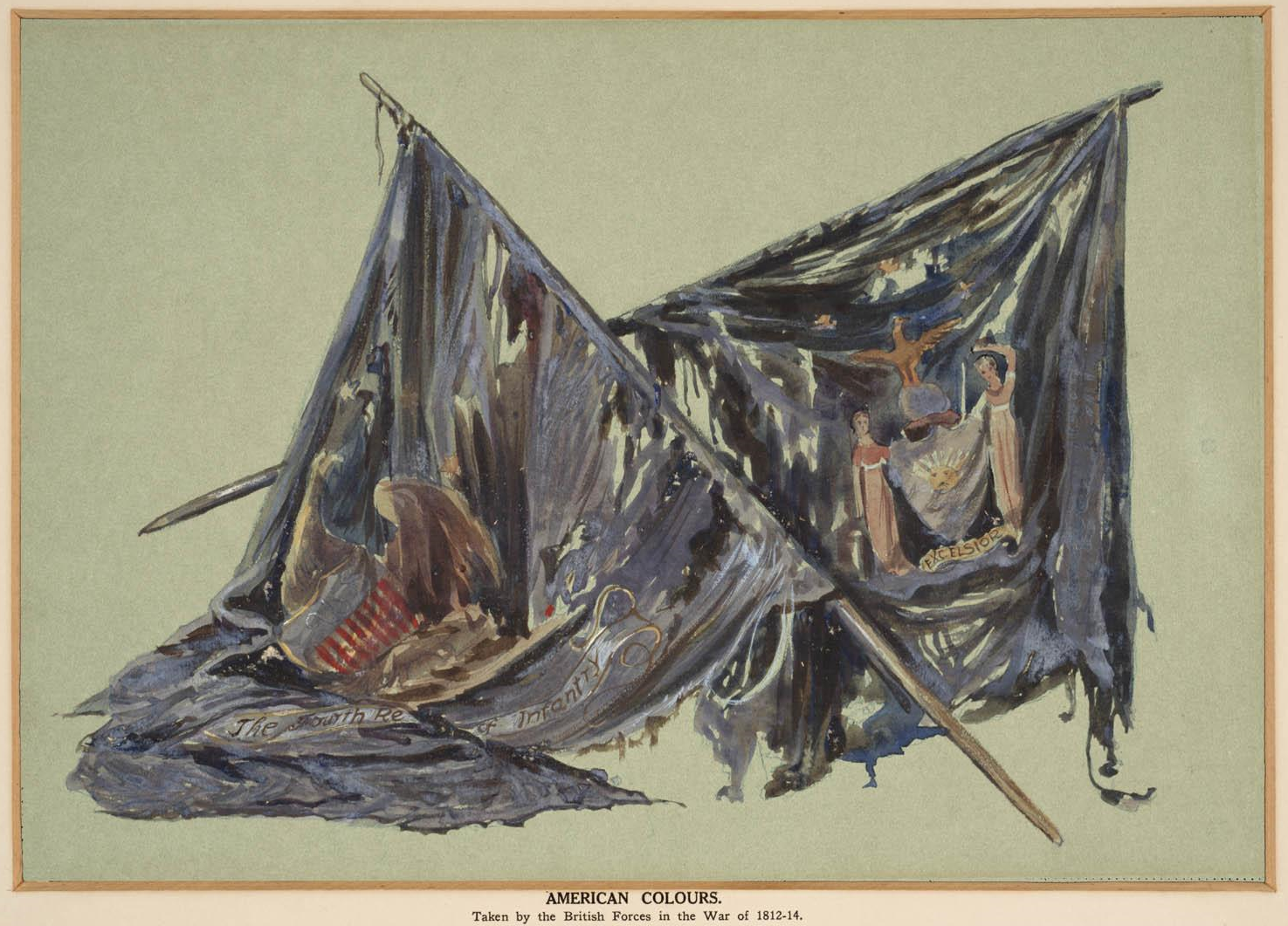
State flag from the War of 1812

== See also ==
- State of New York
- Symbols of the state of New York
- Flags of governors of the U.S. states
- Flags of New York City
