= Flag of Kentucky =

U.S. state flag

Kentucky
- The Bluegrass State
- Use: Civil and state flag
- Proportion: 10:19
- Adopted: March 26, 1918 (standardized June 14, 1962)
- Design: A state seal with gold outer line circle on a navy blue field.
- Designed by: Jesse Cox Burgess

The flag of the Commonwealth of Kentucky, a U.S. state, was adopted by the Kentucky General Assembly on March 26, 1918. It features a navy blue field with the Commonwealth's seal at its center, the words "Commonwealth of Kentucky" above, and sprigs of goldenrod, the state flower, below. The seal depicts a pioneer and a statesman embracing, symbolizing the unity of frontiersmen and statesmen; while popular legend identifies them as Daniel Boone and Henry Clay, the official interpretation is that they represent all such figures collectively.

Kentucky's flag was designed by Jesse Cox Burgess, an art teacher in Frankfort, though flags similar to the current version were in use as early as 1880. In June 1962, the flag was standardized, specifically the flag size and the design of the seal.

In 2001, the North American Vexillological Association surveyed its members on the designs of the 72 Canadian provincial, U.S. state, and U.S. territorial flags; Kentucky's flag was ranked 66th.

== Design specifications ==
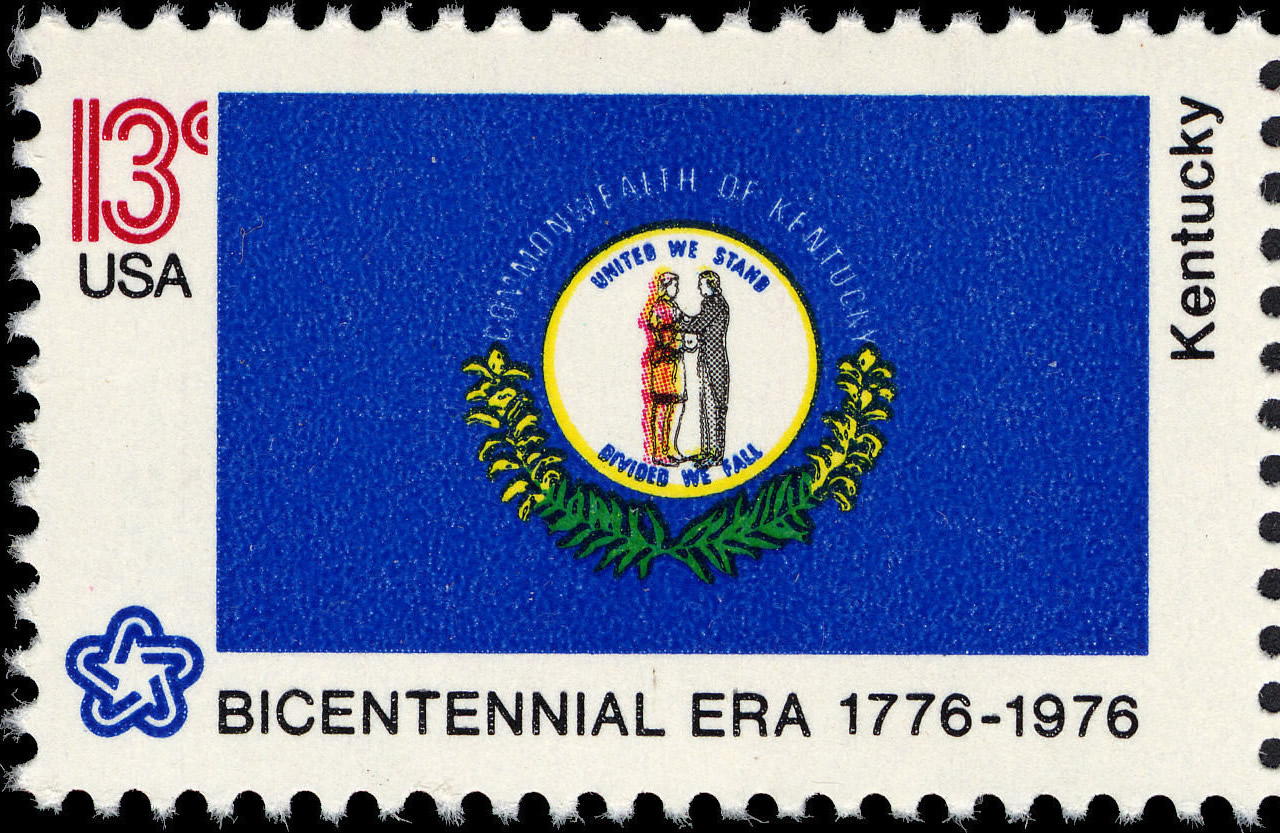
The Kentucky state flag as depicted in the 1976 bicentennial postage stamp series.

Kentucky Revised Statutes 2.030 states that:

The official state flag of the Commonwealth of Kentucky shall be of navy blue silk, nylon, wool or cotton bunting, or some other suitable material, with the seal of the Commonwealth encircled by a wreath, the lower half of which shall be goldenrod in bloom and the upper half the words 'Commonwealth of Kentucky,' embroidered, printed, painted or stamped on the center thereof.

The statute further specifies the proportions of the flag:

The dimensions of the flag may vary, but the length shall be one and nine-tenths (1 9/10) times the width and the diameter of the seal and encirclement shall be approximately two-thirds (2/3) the width of the flag.

The statute further specifies the flagstaff emblem and display guidelines:

The emblem at the head of a flagstaff used to display the flag of the Commonwealth of Kentucky shall be the Kentucky cardinal in an alert but restful pose, cast in bronze, brass or other suitable material. The flying of the state flag at all state buildings and installations including public school buildings, National Guard armories, state parks and other such buildings is considered proper and is encouraged.

== History ==
Pre-official flags

During the Mexican American-War the state organized the 2nd Regiment Kentucky Volunteers. They carried with them a state flag that bore state seal on a field of blue, similar to the modern one but with no wreath.

In 1852, the city of New Orleans held a large parade in remembrance of Henry Clay, John C. Calhoun, and Daniel Webster. The delegates from the state flew a unique flag. It had a green field with the words: "Our dead live in history," and "Seal of Kentucky," at the top. The state seal was in the middle with the words: "Kentucky Mourns," below it. The backside had a portrait of Henry Clay at his plantation, underneath was the words: "Our whole country."

Official flags

In 1880, Joseph P. Nuckols, the Adjutant General appointed a Committee to design a flag for the State Guard. The flag was described as containing a blue background with the state seal in the center, an Eagle placed above the seal. In the eagle beak is a scroll inscribed with "United We Stand, Divided We Fall." Underneath the seal in gold the Regimental or Battalion number with the letters: "K. S. G."

A flag referred to as a state flag was mentioned in 1883. The design was given to the Adjutant General's Department and was described as: "It will bear the coat-of-arms of the state, the figures being correct portraits of Daniel Boone and Dick Tateboon companions of the early day."

During the Spanish-American War, regiments from Kentucky carried a blue regimental flags bearing the state seal in the center and the regimental number ether below or above it, with the inscription "U.S.V." or "U.S.V.I."

In 1915, the Kentucky State Association of Washington, D.C. request the state legislature for a flag.

== Pledge ==
In 2000, the General Assembly adopted the following pledge of allegiance to the flag of Kentucky:

I pledge allegiance to the Kentucky flag, and to the Sovereign State for which it stands, one Commonwealth, blessed with diversity, natural wealth, beauty, and grace from on High."

== Gallery ==
Flag used by Kentucky's delegates at the 1860 Republican National Convention

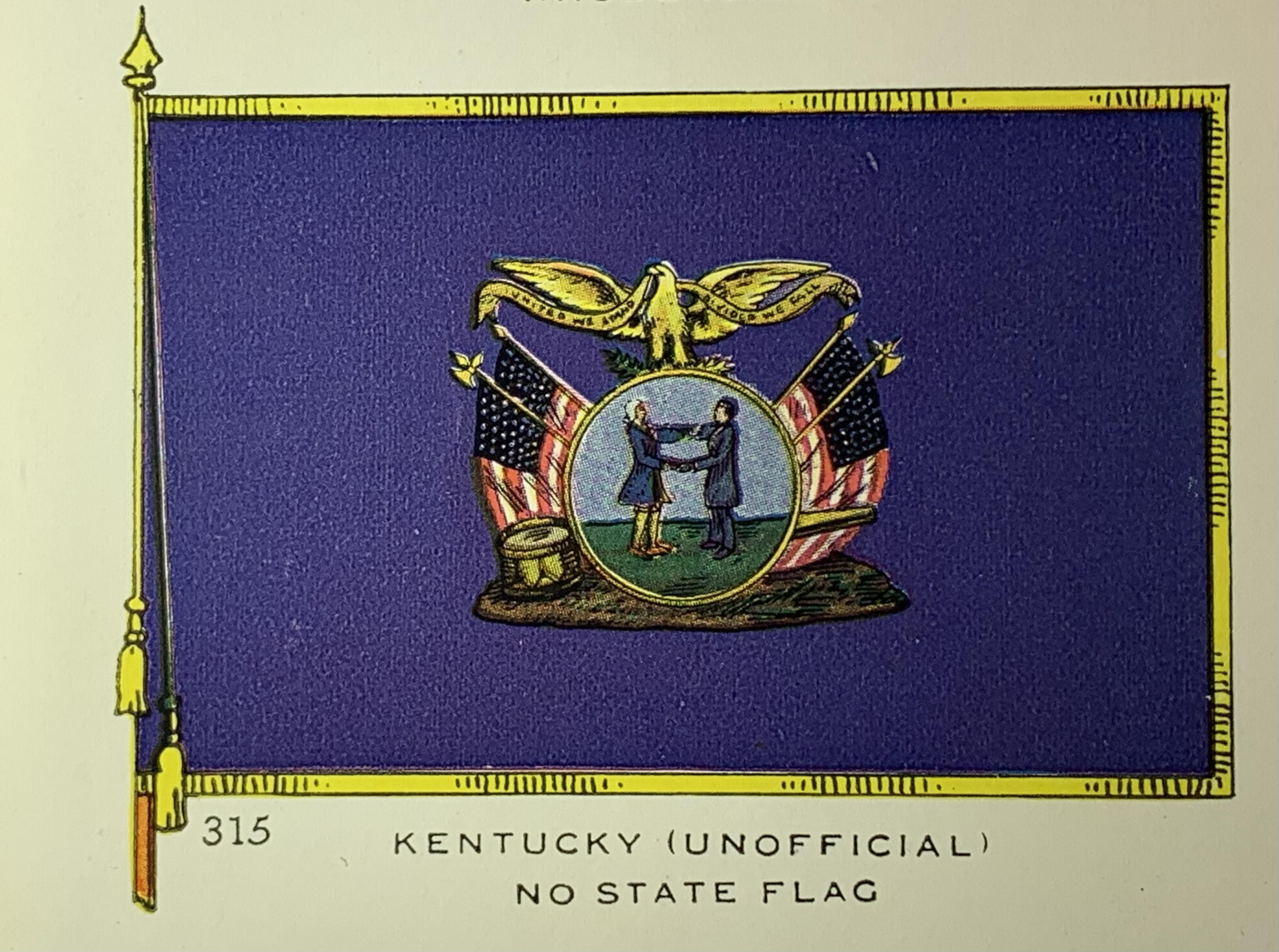
Flag of the Kentucky State Guard. The flag is referred to as the unofficial state flag in this 1917 flag book.

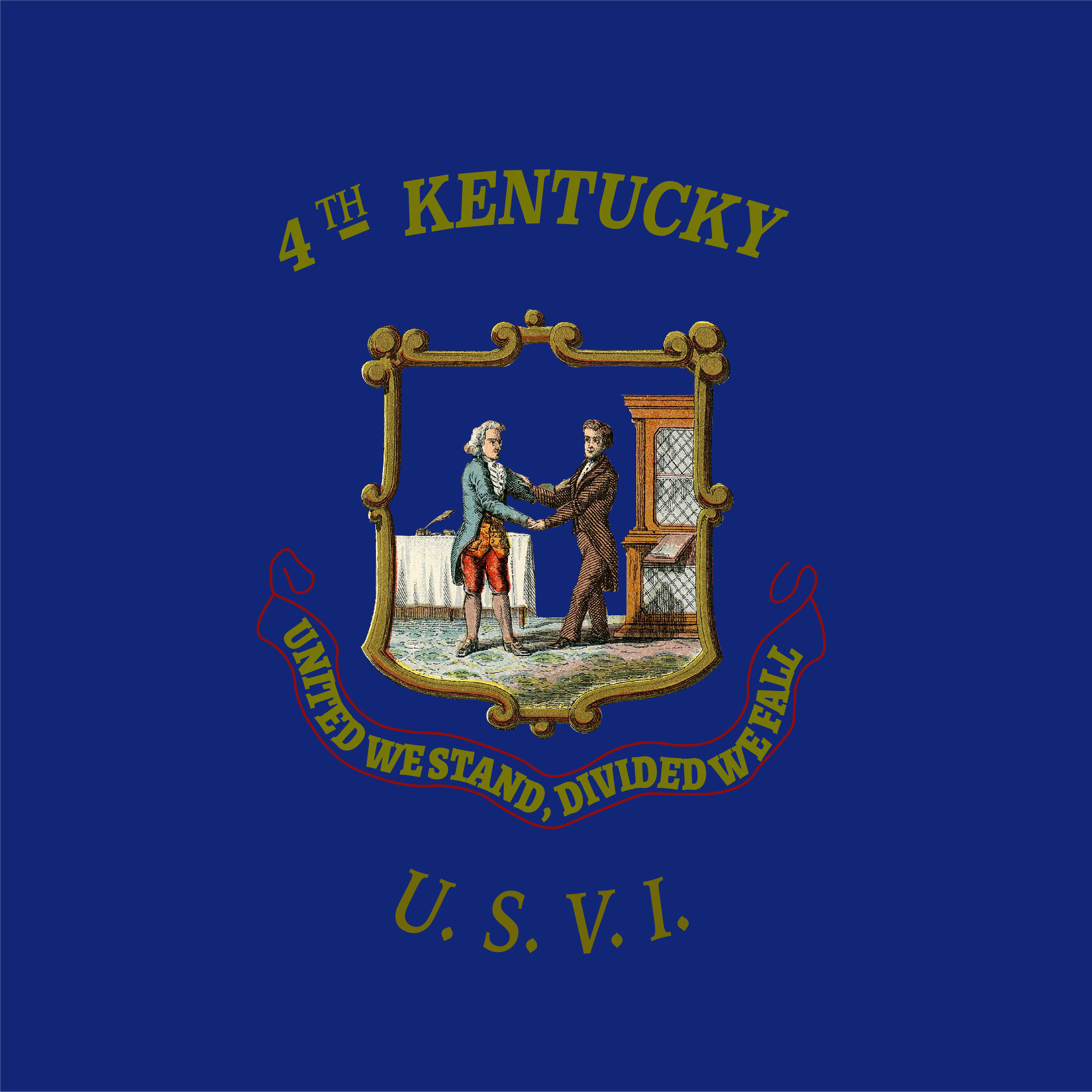
Flag carried by Fourth Kentucky Volunteer Infantry during the Spanish-American War

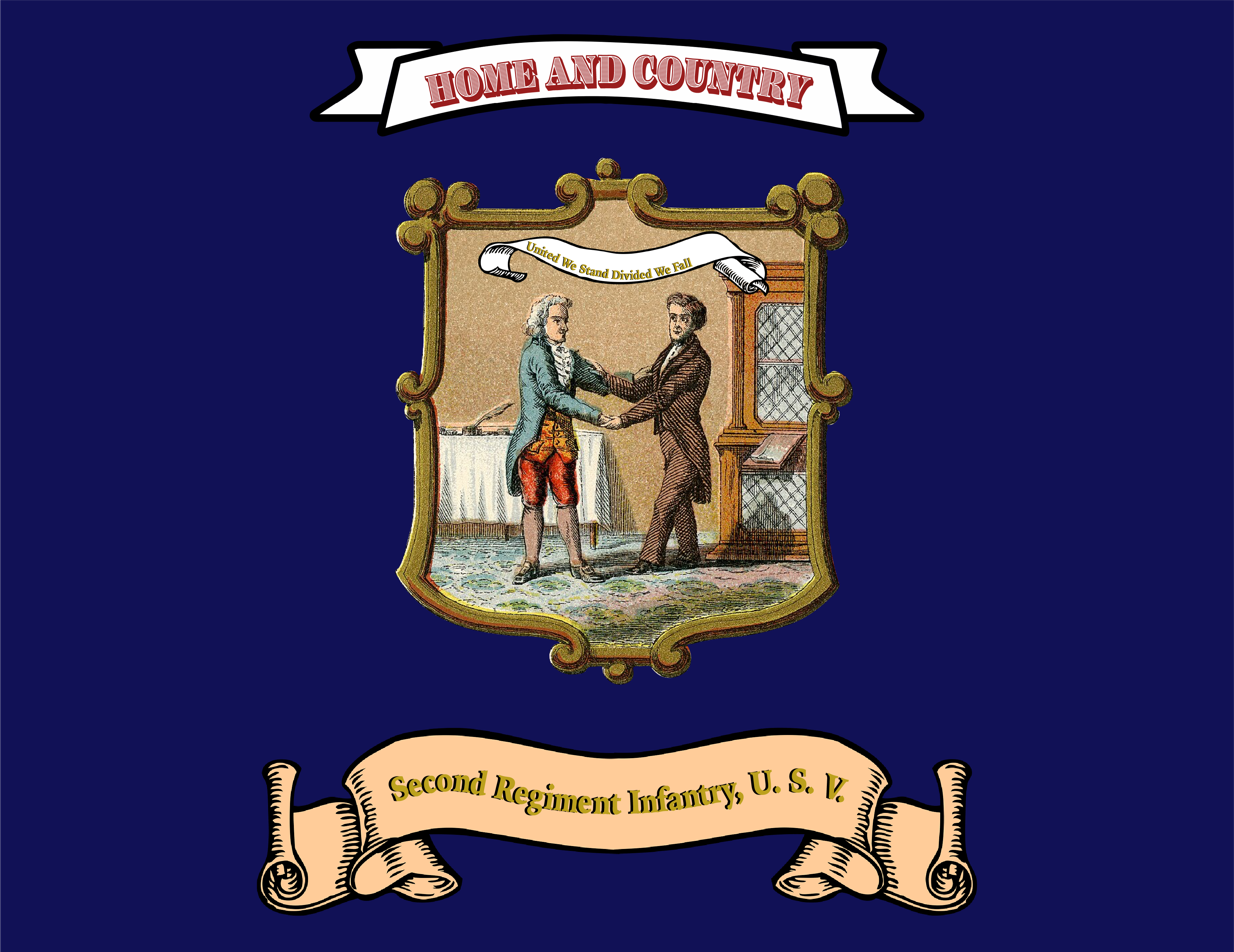
Digital reconstruction of the flag carried by Second Regiment, Kentucky Volunteers during the Spanish-American War

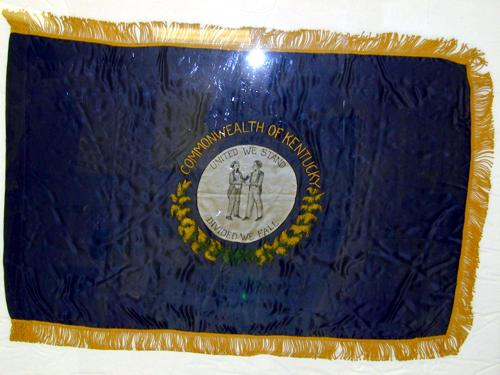
The original copy of the state flag as adopted in 1918.

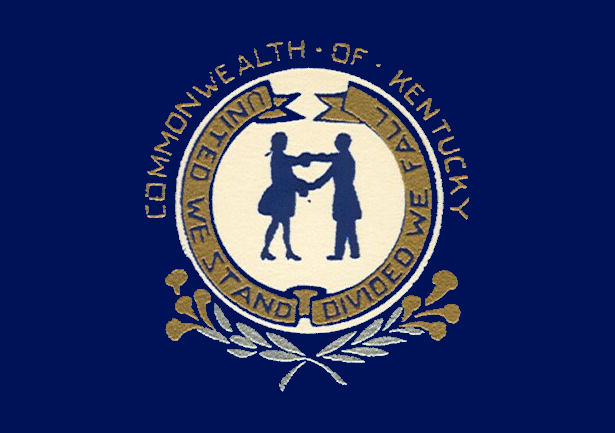
Old Kentucky state flag from the 1940s.

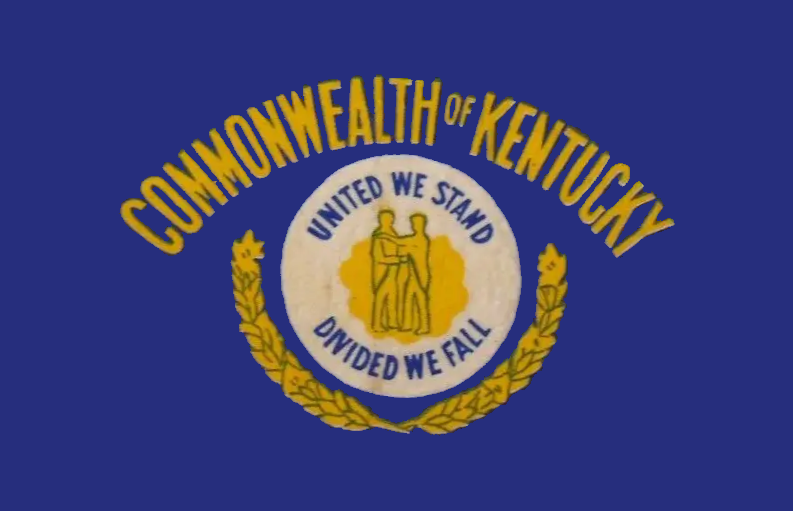
Old Kentucky state flag from the 1960s.

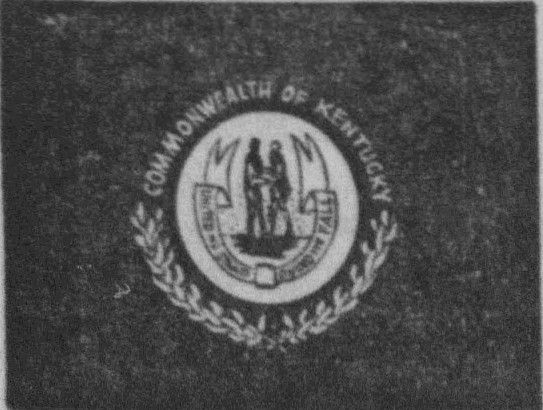
A state flag from the 1960s

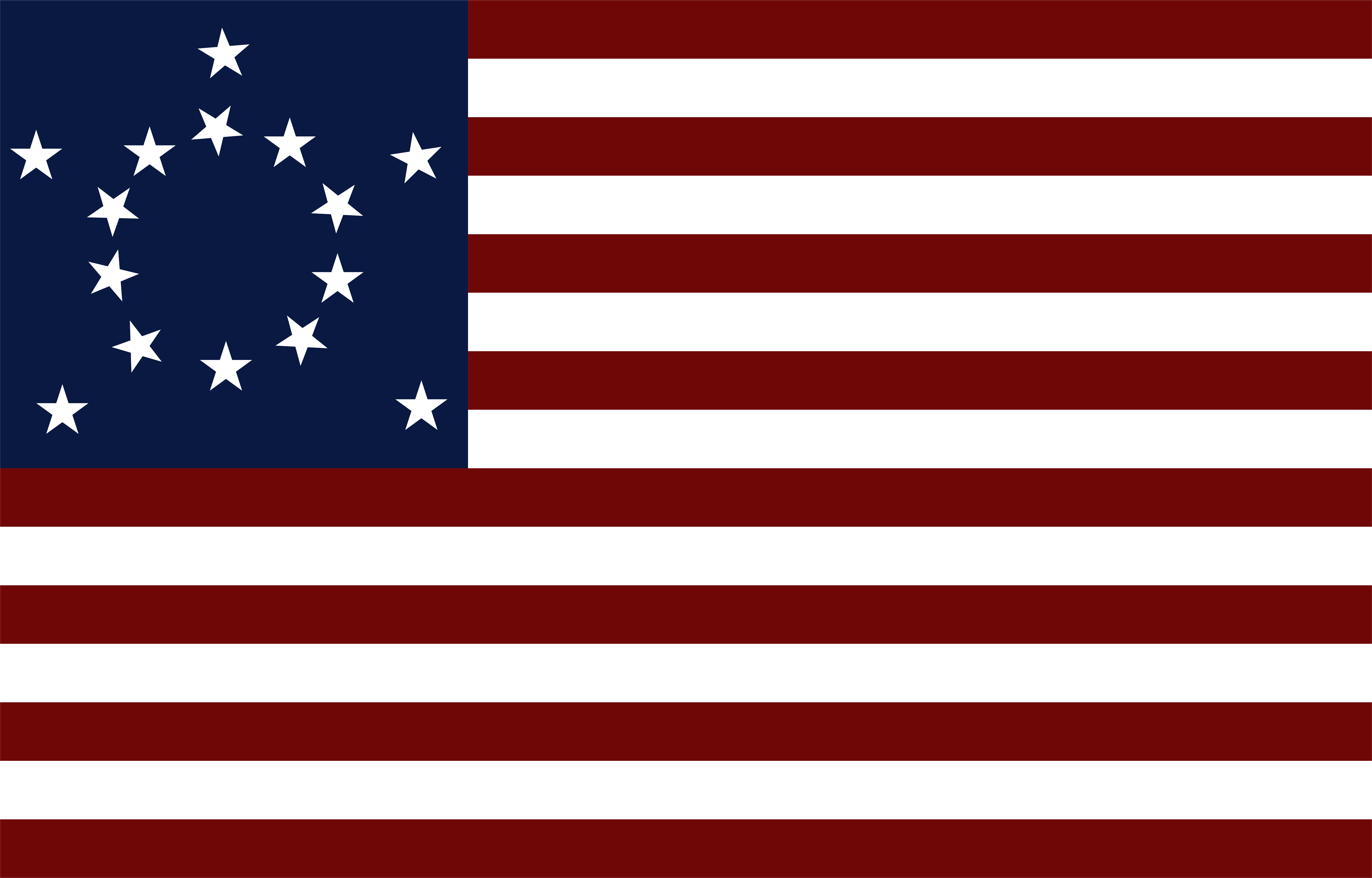
Kentucky's bi-centennial flag, 1992

== See also ==
- Seal of Kentucky
- Symbols of the Commonwealth of Kentucky
