= Olin R. Moyle =

Olin Richmond Moyle (August 28, 1887 – November 26, 1966) was a religious Jew and leading Jewish missionary affiliated with the United Israel World Union, seeking to convert people, especially Christians, to Judaism. He was particularly opposed to his former faith of Jehovah's Witnesses. Working as legal counsel for the Watch Tower Bible and Tract Society from 1935 to 1939, he helped represent Jehovah's Witnesses in two cases before the United States Supreme Court, which set new precedents on First Amendment freedoms. A dispute with Watch Tower Society president J. F. Rutherford led to Moyle's expulsion from the religion. Moyle later sued the Watch Tower Society for libel over an article in its magazine, The Watchtower.

== Watch Tower Society association ==
Moyle began associating with Charles Taze Russell's Bible Students group about 1910. In 1935, Moyle, his wife and son left their home in Wauwatosa, Wisconsin and moved into the Brooklyn, New York headquarters of the Watch Tower Bible and Tract Society to serve as its legal counsel, heading its newly formed Legal Department. The department had been established by Rutherford to help Jehovah's Witnesses throughout the US mount court cases to defend themselves amid increasing opposition to their preaching and stance on flag salute. Rutherford and Moyle jointly represented the Watch Tower Society in various lawsuits. In 1938, Moyle won the Lovell v. City of Griffin case before the Supreme Court of the United States and the same year sent a letter to President Roosevelt condemning his support of "Fascist" Catholicism.

== Resignation ==
On July 21, 1939, Moyle wrote an open letter of resignation to Rutherford, protesting over conditions at Bethel, the Watch Tower Society's Brooklyn headquarters, including what he described as ill treatment of workers, discrimination by Rutherford, the use and encouragement of "filthy and vulgar language" and a "glorification" of alcohol. Moyle said that Rutherford had "many many homes, to wit, Bethel, Staten Island, California" and deplored "the difference between the accommodations furnished to you, and your personal attendants, compared with those furnished to some of your brethren".

Moyle had been handling the famous Minersville School District v. Gobitis case, and had won at the trial court level as well as at the appellate level. However, after Moyle's removal from the case, the Minersville School District appealed the Gobitis case to the Supreme Court. Rutherford himself argued the case before the Supreme Court in 1940, and the Court ruled against Jehovah's Witnesses by a vote of 8-1. Three years later the Supreme Court overruled this decision in West Virginia State Board of Education v. Barnette, 319 U.S. 624 (1943), argued by Moyle's successor, Hayden Covington.

== Libel lawsuit ==
Although Moyle had advised his resignation would take effect on September 1, the Watch Tower board dismissed him immediately and he returned to his home congregation in Wisconsin. On October 15, 1939 the directors responded in the pages of The Watchtower, stating that "every paragraph of that letter is false, filled with lies, and is a wicked slander and a libel". The article compared his actions with those of Judas Iscariot.

For four years past the writer of that letter has been entrusted with the confidential matters of the Society. It now appears that the writer of that letter, without excuse, libels the family of God at Bethel, and identifies himself as one who speaks evil against the Lord's organization, and who is a murmurer and complainer, even as the scriptures have foretold. (Jude 4–16; 1Cor. 4:3; Rom 14:4) The members of the board of directors hereby resent the unjust criticism appearing in that letter, disapprove of the writer and his actions, and recommend the president of the Society immediately terminate the relationship of O. R. Moyle to the Society as legal counsel and as a member of the Bethel family.

— Joseph F. Rutherford, The Watchtower, 1939-10-15

Moyle was disfellowshipped by his congregation, which wrote a letter to The Watchtower stating that they had not read Moyle's letter, but disapproved of his actions and "never listen to accusations against Brother Rutherford". In 1940, Moyle sued the Watch Tower Bible and Tract Society of Pennsylvania and the Watchtower Bible and Tract Society of New York over the response in The Watchtower. Rutherford presented a public resolution at a 1941 convention against Moyle, with reference to the September 15, 1941 issue of The Watchtower. Moyle won his suit, and the court awarded him $30,000 in damages, which was reduced to $15,000 on appeal in 1944.

The initial jury verdict was affirmed twice on appeal; first by the five member Appellate Division, 2nd Department (3-2); and second, unanimously, by the seven members of the state's highest court, The Court of Appeals, in the capitol at Albany.

== Later life ==
Moyle later served as the vice president of the Jefferson County Bar Association in Wisconsin, and was recognized by Rand McNally in its national list of "bank recommended attorneys".

Moyle became involved with David Horowitz and the work of the United Israel World Union, formed in 1944 to "preach a universal Hebraic faith for all humankind". The 1978 edition of The Encyclopedia of American Religions describes "former Jehovah's Witness Olin Moyle" as having been "[a]mong the leaders" of the movement, "a vigorous missionary program to convert people, particularly Christians, to Judaism".
