= Howard Fineman =

American journalist (1948–2024)

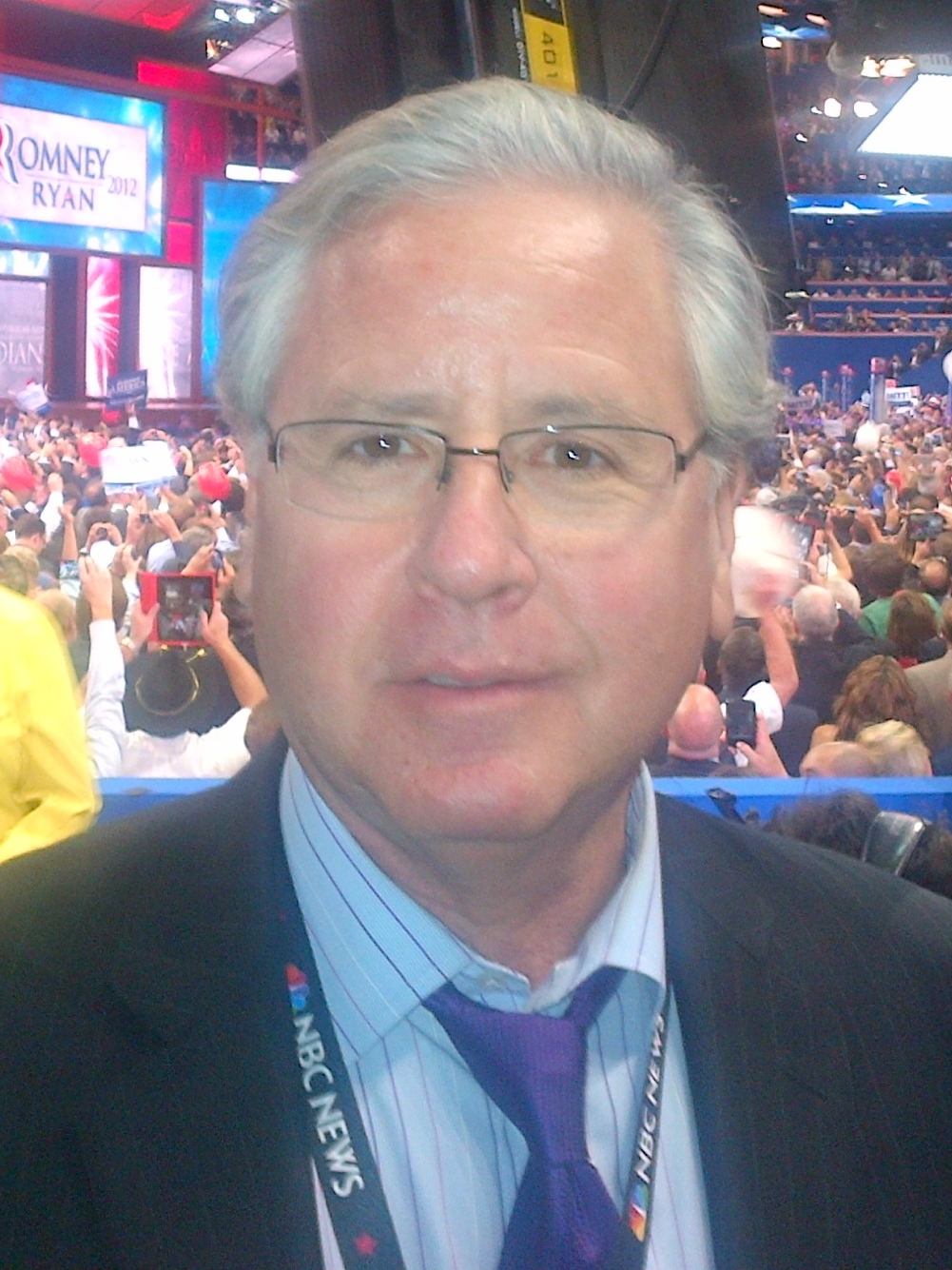
- Fineman at the 2012 Republican National Convention in Tampa, Florida 90
- Born: Howard David Fineman; November 17, 1948; Pittsburgh, Pennsylvania, U.S.
- Died: June 11, 2024 (aged 75); Washington, D.C., U.S.
- Education: Colgate University (A.B.); Columbia University Graduate School of Journalism (M.S.); University of Louisville School of Law (J.D.)
- Occupation: Journalist
- Spouse: Amy L. Nathan (m. 1981)
- Children: 2

Howard David Fineman (November 17, 1948 – June 11, 2024) was an American journalist and television commentator. In a career that spanned nearly five decades, Fineman covered nine presidential campaigns as a reporter, writer, and analyst. For 30 years, he drove Newsweek magazine's political coverage. At the height of the publication's influence, Fineman was its chief political correspondent, senior editor, and deputy Washington bureau chief. His "Living Politics" column was posted weekly on Newsweek.com. After his tenure at Newsweek, he was named global editorial director of the AOL Huffington Post Media Group.

Fineman was also an NBC News analyst, contributing reports to the network and its cable affiliate MSNBC. He appeared regularly on Hardball with Chris Matthews, Countdown with Keith Olbermann, The Last Word with Lawrence O'Donnell, and The Rachel Maddow Show. The author of scores of Newsweek cover stories, Fineman's work appeared in The New York Times, The Washington Post, The New Republic, and RealClearPolitics, where he was a contributing correspondent during the 2020 election cycle. Between 2017 and 2019, Fineman was a lecturer at the University of Pennsylvania Annenberg School of Communications, teaching a seminar on “New Media Journalism and Politics in the Trump Era.” He authored The Thirteen American Arguments: Enduring Debates That Define and Inspire Our Country, which takes the position that the United States is a nation built on healthy disagreements and arguments.

== Early life and education ==
Fineman was born in 1948 and grew up in a Jewish family in the Squirrel Hill neighborhood of Pittsburgh. He was the son of Jean (née Lederman) and Charles Fineman, both teachers. Howard attended Colfax Elementary and Taylor Allderdice High School, graduating in 1966.

The family belonged to the Tree of Life – Or L'Simcha Congregation, where Fineman celebrated his bar mitzvah. In 2018, he wrote an opinion piece for the New York Times about how the horrific attack on the temple by an antisemite, killing eleven people, "is part of a larger pattern of mayhem and hatred in America and around the world".

Fineman earned a Bachelor of Arts from Colgate University (where he was Phi Beta Kappa and a member of Beta Theta Pi), a Master of Science degree in journalism from the Columbia University Graduate School of Journalism, and a Juris Doctor from the University of Louisville School of Law. His legal education included a year studying at the Georgetown University Law Center. He was a recipient of both the Thomas J. Watson Fellowship and the Pulitzer Traveling Fellowship for study in Europe, Russia and the Middle East. He used the grant to travel to Ukraine and explore his family's Jewish roots. In March 2022, he wrote about the experience after Russia invaded Ukraine.

== Career ==
Fineman began his journalism career at The Louisville Courier-Journal, covering the environment, the coal industry and state politics before joining the newspaper's Washington bureau in 1978. He moved to Newsweek in 1980, where he was named Chief Political Correspondent in 1984, Deputy Washington Bureau Chief in 1993 and Senior Editor in 1995. He became a regular guest on Tony Kornheiser's eponymous podcast (The Tony Kornheiser Show) offering political insight to Kornheiser as well as Pittsburgh sports updates. Kornheiser referred to him as "The Intergalactic Editor of The Huffington Post". In 2010, Fineman became political editor of the Huffington Post, and remained with the organization until 2018, after which he joined NBC News as a commentator.

In a discussion of pack journalism during the 1988 presidential campaign, author/journalist Richard Ben Cramer identifies a Fineman profile piece in Newsweek as the tipping point at which unattributed rumors and whispered speculation about the private life of Democratic candidate Gary Hart were made public and effectively legitimated. Cramer writes that Fineman posed to John McEvoy, a top aide in the 1984 Hart campaign, a series of leading, uncorroborated assertions about Hart's fidelity, finally prompting McEvoy to say, "Yuh, well, you know ... he'll always be in jeopardy ... if he can't keep his pants on." McEvoy later complained that the comment was off the record and, in any event, based solely on speculation, but Fineman bootstrapped the quote into publication with the unattributed lead-in "many political observers expect the rumors to emerge as a campaign issue." The subsequent media focus resulted in Hart's decision to drop his candidacy.

== Accomplishments and awards ==
Fineman covered the contentious 2000 presidential campaign, and subsequently covered the presidency of George W. Bush. A Newsweek cover story in November 2001 featured the president's first extensive interview following the September 11 attacks. Fineman's awards include a "Page One" from the Headliners Club of New York, a "Silver Gavel" from the American Bar Association, and a "Deadline Club" from the Society of Professional Journalists.

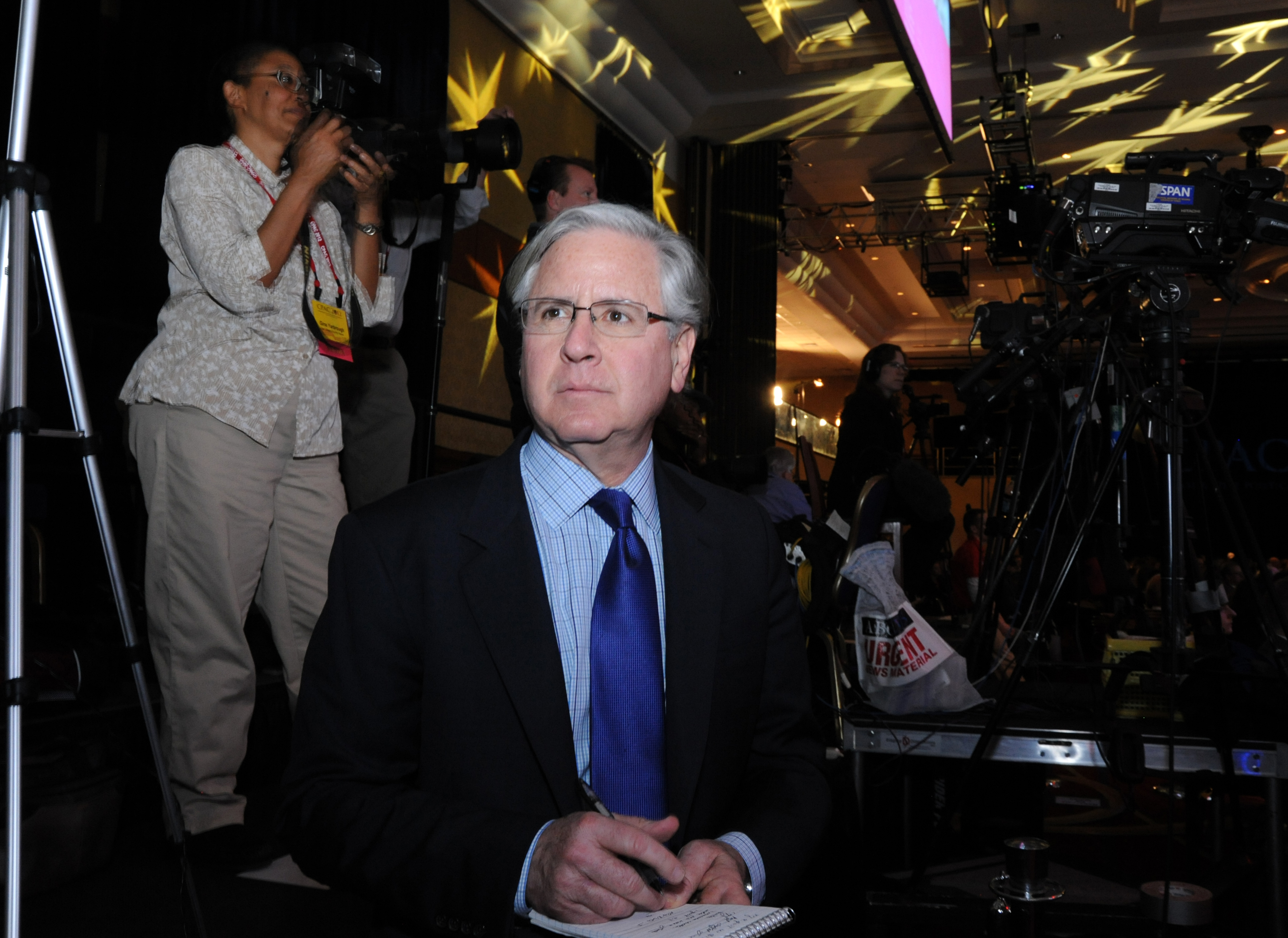
Fineman on the campaign trail at the CPAC Conference (February 2012)

Fineman wrote on the rise of the "religious right", the power of talk radio, race and politics, and the Pledge of Allegiance controversy. He interviewed business leaders such as Bill Gates, Steve Case, and Steve Ballmer. He interviewed GOP operative Lee Atwater, in the documentary Boogie Man: The Lee Atwater Story. Fineman reported for NBC, and appeared on most major public affairs shows. He was a panelist on PBS's Washington Week in Review from 1983 to 1995, and on CNN's Capital Gang from 1995 to 1998.

Fineman held honorary degrees from Colgate University, the University of Louisville Washington and Jefferson College, and Gettysburg College. Fineman, a distinguished political journalist, was celebrated for his skill in navigating and influencing political discourse through breaking news and in-depth analysis. Committed to journalism's democratic role, he advocated for a strong news industry to counter misinformation and polarization.

== Personal life and death ==
In 1981, Fineman married lawyer Amy Nathan and had a son and daughter. Their son Nick followed his father into news media becoming a television news producer.

On June 11, 2024, aged 75, Fineman died from pancreatic cancer at his home in Washington, D.C.
