= Criticism of the Pledge of Allegiance =

Various criticisms of the American Salute to the Flag

The Pledge of Allegiance of the United States has been criticized on several grounds. Its use in government funded schools has been the most controversial, as critics contend that a government-sanctioned endorsement of religion violates the Establishment Clause of the First Amendment to the U.S. Constitution. Arguments against the pledge include that the pledge itself is incompatible with democracy and freedom, that it is a form of nationalistic indoctrination, that pledges of allegiance are features of current and former totalitarian states such as Nazi Germany, and that the pledge was written to sell flags.

== Religious issues ==
Even before the addition of the phrase "under God" in 1954, legal challenges were frequently founded on the basis of freedom of religion. Central to early challenges were Jehovah's Witnesses, a group whose beliefs preclude swearing loyalty to any power lesser than God. In the 1940 Supreme Court case Minersville School District vs. Gobitis, an 8–1 majority in the Court held that a school district's interest in promoting national unity permitted it to require Witness students to recite the Pledge along with their classmates. Gobitis was an unpopular decision in the press, and it led to a rash of mob violence and intimidation against Jehovah's Witnesses.

Three years later in West Virginia State Board of Education vs. Barnette, the Court reversed itself, voting 6–3 to forbid a school from requiring the Pledge. As a result, since 1943 public schools have been disallowed from punishing students for not reciting the Pledge. Nonetheless, it remains taught to and expected of school children in many schools, as the Court leaves many details in such matters up to respective state governments. More specific objections have been raised since the addition of the phrase "under God" to the Pledge. The year of its addition, 1954, was also near the beginning of the Cold War anti-communist movement in the United States.

=== Matter of Lewis v. Allen ===
In response to the June 14, 1954 Congressional change of the wording of the Pledge (found in U.S. Code, tit. 36 § 172) to include "under God", a series of lawsuits were filed in the New York State courts by Joseph L. Lewis challenging the constitutionality of the addition of the new phrase. Lewis was a publisher, writer, and co-founder of Freethinkers of America. As the cases involved Joseph Lewis desiring the Court to order the Commissioner of Education of The State of New York, James E. Allen Jr. to remove the new words from the Pledge, these cases are referred to as the Matter of Lewis v. Allen.

==== 1957 case ====
The first case brought by Lewis found its way to the New York State Supreme Court in 1957. Joseph Lewis maintained that the Commissioner of Education of the State of New York had a duty, which he had failed to perform, to revoke the regulation requiring the recitation of the Pledge with the new phrase, and reinstate the old wording. Lewis did not cite any state regulations concerning the Commissioner, but held the Commissioner was bound to act by the U.S. First Amendment (which was applied to the State governments through the Fourteenth Amendment) and by article I and XI of the New York State Constitution.

The court held that it was not within the Commissioner's domain to determine the constitutionality of acts performed by the State or Federal Legislatures. The Court then turned to Lewis' contention that the New York law that ordered the recitation of the Pledge had been rendered unconstitutional by the new wording, "Petitioners claim that freethinkers, nonbelievers, atheists and agnostics cannot be compelled to recite the present pledge of allegiance because it includes the words 'under God', and such compulsion violates the aforesaid constitutional provisions." Referencing the 1943 case West Virginia State Board of Education v. Barnette, which resulted in fines and threats of imprisonment against those refusing to say the pledge being ruled unconstitutional, the Court held that "The regulation under attack here has no compulsory aspect. No penalties attach to a failure or refusal to recite the pledge.The pledge is made voluntarily and no penalties are imposed for noncompliance."

Having pointed out that neither threats nor actual imprisonment or deprivation of property had made for noncompliance, the Court moved onto the other half of the definition of "establishment" set out in Supreme Court Justice Robert H. Jackson's concurring opinion in McCollum v. Board of Education. New York State Justice Isadore Bookstein wrote "If I properly apprehend the intent, design and purposes of the First Amendment, it was conceived to prevent and prohibit the establishment of a State Religion; it was not intended to prevent or prohibit the growth and development of a Religious State."

Operating on the interpretation of the First Amendment that holds that the state is prohibited from establishing a single religion or denomination as the official religion, but is free to support all religions in general (as long as it shows none of them preference above the others), Justice Bookstein listed several examples felt to support that interpretation. These included Supreme Court rulings such as the 1892 Church of the Holy Trinity v. United States which stated "this is a religious nation", and the 1952 ruling Zorach v. Clauson which stated "We are a religious people whose institutions presuppose a Supreme Being." Bookstein also cited wording in the Declaration of Independence, the Gettysburg Address, and the preamble of the New York Constitution which expressed gratitude "to Almighty God for our Freedom". In addition the Justice pointed out that American coins had "In God we trust" inscribed on them (a practice that had been implemented sporadically since 1864), and pointed to the Presidential oath of "So help me, God" (he made no mention that the Constitution gives the president-elect the option to affirm without invoking a deity).

Bookstein wrote "If petitioners' contention be sound, it may be wondered whether the public school curriculum might properly include the Declaration of Independence and the Gettysburg Address. Could "America" ("Protect us by thy might, Great God, our King!") be sung in a public school without offending the First Amendment? And might not the presidential oath of office have questionable constitutional status?" The Justice held with House Report No. 1693 that the Zorach v. Clauson case "clearly indicated that the references to the Almighty which run through our laws, our public rituals, and our ceremonies in no way flout the provisions of the First Amendment. ... [for] if this recognition of the Almighty was not so, then even a fastidious atheist or agnostic could object to the way in which the Court itself opens each of its sessions, namely, 'God save the United States and the Honorable Court'."

Bookstein held that "the child of a nonbeliever may simply omit the words, 'under God', in reciting the pledge. His 'non-conformity', if such it be, will not, in the circumstances of this case, set him apart from his fellow students or bring 'pressure' to bear in any real sense." Bookstein again cited Zorach v. Clauson holding that to side with Lewis' claims against the government "'would be preferring those who believe in no religion over those who do not'. The First Amendment does not require this." Justice Bookstein's words in this ruling were later quoted by the state of New York in one of its briefs, when defending its position in the Engel v. Vitale case before the United States Supreme Court.

==== 1960 case ====
Lewis brought a similar argument in 1960 holding that the Pledge with the new words was unconstitutional "as it involves 'the use of the public schools—both physically and pedagogically—for the dissemination of purely religious dogma' and, second, as it imposes 'an intolerable degree of compulsion upon the young children of non-believers ... to listen to, learn and repeat thousands of time a religious concept which they repudiate and abhor'".

The Court cited New York's recent decision in the case Engles v. Vitale where the state had allowed officials of a school district to order its teachers to teach and lead students in a nondenominational prayer crafted by the government to remain in place as long as more safeguards were put into place to insure that students and parents were informed that children could remove themselves from the classroom if they did not wish to participate or be exposed to the prayer crafted by the New York board of Regents (this decision was later reversed by the United States Supreme court in 1963). The New York Court held that due to the 1943 case West Virginia State Board of Education v. Barnette there was general knowledge that there could be no compulsion on students to participate or expose themselves to the Pledge.

The Court dismissed Lewis' claims that the pledge was an establishment of religion citing Zorach v. Clauson, "There cannot be the slightest doubt that the First Amendment reflect the philosophy that Church and State should be separated. ... The First Amendment, however, does not say that in every and all respects there shall be a separation of Church and State. Rather, it studiously defines the manner, the specific ways, in which there shall be no concert or union or dependency one on the other. That is the common sense of the matter. Otherwise the state and religion would be aliens to each other—hostile, suspicious, and even unfriendly. ... Prayers in our legislative halls; the appeals to the Almighty that run through our laws, our public rituals, our ceremonies would be flouting the First Amendment."

The court also dismissed Lewis' argument that the Pledge violated New York's Constitution that "'forbids the use of public money or other property in aid of any denominational school or any school' in which any denominational tenet or doctrine is taught". Stating simply, "From our determination that the claim of unconstitutionality under the First Amendment cannot be sustained, it follows that the regulation does not contravene the like provisions of the State Constitution."

When Lewis appealed this decision to the New York Court of Appeals in 1964, that court affirmed the previous decision which ruled against his position.

=== Links to the school prayer controversy ===
The use of the Pledge of Allegiance has been cited in landmark cases concerning government-led prayer within public schools. These decisions, made in the 1960s, were often seen suspiciously as they occurred during the Cold War against the USSR which was officially atheistic. In addition, many Southern politicians saw these rulings, along with the concurrent decisions advancing racial civil rights, as an assault on states' rights.

==== Engel v. Vitale ====
In 1962 the United States Supreme Court addressed the question of whether a government-led school prayer "to be said in conjunction with the Pledge of Allegiance and 'as an incident to the Pledge of Allegiance ceremony'" was constitutional in the case Engel v. Vitale.

In the state's briefs, "the insertion of the words 'under God' in the Pledge of Allegiance" was cited as one of the "literally countless illustrations ... [to] the fact that belief and trust in a Supreme Being was from the beginning and has been continuously part of the very essence of the American plan of government."

In part, the state of New York defended the prayer by equating its effects with the Pledge, saying in one of their briefs "The Regents' Prayer ... serves as a simple reminder that Americans trust in God, as the Pledge of Allegiance serves as a simple reminder of our obligations to our 'one nation under God'." They pointed out that "The challenged recitation follows the pledge of allegiance, which itself refers to God", and held that if the court outlawed the government-crafted prayer due to "the conscientious objections of the minority" that "Such a determination would require not only that the Regents' Prayer be discontinued, but also that all schools cease the voluntary recitation of the pledge of allegiance, which, as amended by 36 U.S.C. §172, contains the words 'under God'."

The Court ruled that government-crafted and led prayer was unconstitutional. The decision was highly controversial, and obiter dictum within Justice William O. Douglas's concurring opinion received particular attention.

===== Justice Douglas's obiter dictum =====
In his obiter dictum, Douglas postulated what the reasoning of the ruling might have on current government practices. He wrote: "The point for decision is whether the Government can constitutionally finance a religious exercise. Our system at the federal and state levels is presently honeycombed with such financing. Nevertheless, I think it is an unconstitutional undertaking whatever form it takes." In a footnote illustrating "such financing," he also noted that "The slogan 'In God We Trust' is used by the Treasury Department, and Congress recently added God to the pledge of allegiance", thereby calling those practices' constitutionality into question as well.

Opponents of the decision (including legislators calling for an amendment to the U.S. Constitution to reverse its effects) saw Douglas's obiter dictum as a likely indicator of future decisions including the end of daily recitals of the Pledge in schools.

Senator Absalom Willis Robertson berated the decision and declared "We have no clear assurance that the Court will not follow the broad concurring opinion of Mr. Justice Douglas in rendering future decisions. That is why I say we cannot sit complacently".

Senator Herman Talmadge asked Robertson, "[Can you theorize] If they did what their decision presages? It would remove all the chaplains in the armed services, the Pledge of Allegiance to the Flag, the word 'God' in The Star-Spangled Banner, and everything else that the American Republic has held dear throughout the history of our country." To which Robertson replied "That is the clear implication of the concurring opinion of Mr. Justice Douglas."

Senator Wayne Morse, despite coming to an acceptance of the ruling, expressed concern if Douglas's dicta did not indicate a coming end to many practices within the government including the Pledge, saying "Undoubtedly the special concurring opinion of Mr. Justice Douglas will have some persuasive influence not only on practicing lawyers, but also on lower courts. ... [Still, as it is only dicta] what Mr. Justice Douglas said in many parts of the decision does not involve principles and tenets which are yet the law of the land."

==== Abington School District v. Schempp ====
While the move to amend the Constitution to reverse the effects of Engel v. Vitale did not get out of the Congressional Judiciary Committees, and the calls to impeach the Justices or to establish a "Court of the States" (that would allow representatives of the states to act as a court above the Supreme Court) failed to gather support, another school-prayer case came before the Court in 1963. The Court was asked to rule on practices in the states of Pennsylvania and Maryland.

In this case, called Abington School District v. Schempp, the Court considered whether school officials could read aloud or have students read aloud Bible passages for devotional purposes which "was followed by a standing recitation of the Lord's Prayer, together with the Pledge of Allegiance to the Flag by the class in unison". The Court ruled against the state, but avoided saying anything similar to the highly controversial dicta Justice Douglas had previous written.

The decision did specifically mention the Pledge at several points. The Court theorized that the Pledge might be constitutional if either the words "under God" inserted in 1954 had, due to the passage of time, lost their religious meaning by 1963, or if one equated a personal public declaration of loyalty with the act of reading a document created by a historical figure—"This general principle might also serve to insulate the various patriotic exercises and activities used in the public schools and elsewhere which, whatever may have been their origins, no longer have a religious purpose or meaning. The reference to divinity in the revised pledge of allegiance, for example, may merely recognize the historical fact that our Nation was believed to have been founded 'under God'. Thus reciting the pledge may be no more of a religious exercise than the reading aloud of Lincoln's Gettysburg Address, which contains an allusion to the same historical fact."

With this reasoning the Supreme Court specifically categorized the Pledge as secular, contrasting it to the religious exercises under consideration. The Court held that if, as the states claimed, Bible reading and The Lord's Prayer were being used to achieve secular ends ("fostering harmony and tolerance among the pupils"), then:

it would seem that less sensitive materials might equally well serve the same purpose. .... It has not been shown that readings from the speeches and messages of great Americans, for example, or from the documents of our heritage of liberty, daily recitation of the Pledge of Allegiance, or even the observance of a moment of reverent silence at the opening of class, may not adequately serve the solely secular purposes of the devotional activities without jeopardizing either the religious liberties of any members of the community or the proper degree of separation between the spheres of religion and government. Such substitutes would, I think, be unsatisfactory or inadequate only to the extent that the present activities do in fact serve religious goals. While I do not question the judgment of experienced educators that the challenged practices may well achieve valuable secular ends, it seems to me that the State acts unconstitutionally if it either sets about to attain even indirectly religious ends by religious means, or if it uses religious means to serve secular ends where secular means would suffice.

As Justice Douglas's obiter dictum had included questioning the constitutionality of the fact that "There is Bible-reading in the schools of the District of Columbia," the controversy over the Court's rulings did not die out.

==== Parker v. Board of Education ====
On June 17, 1963, the same day that the Schempp case was decided, A. L. Wirin, an attorney for the American Civil Liberties Union, filed a lawsuit on behalf of Haswell Parker, a fifty-one-year-old high school history teacher. Parker, who "said he did not belong to any church", objected "as a matter of personal conscience" to the Los Angeles Board of Education's policy (instated in 1959) that made daily recitation of the pledge with the 1954 addition of the words "under God" mandatory.

This action was decried by both the media and politicians, such as Alan H. Newcomb of WBT-TC who was cited by Senator Sam Ervin, he stated "almost before that opinion [Schempp] was understood by the people, the Civil Liberties Union brought suit .... We suggest that the history teacher study his history. The trend toward eradicating all reference to God from every official document and act in this country is not merely protecting a few tiny minorities from a fancied infringement of their rights. It goes far deeper than that. If carried to the ultimate conclusion, it would destroy the whole American philosophy of human liberty."

The constitutionality of the Pledge was not challenged in 1963 as the Los Angeles Board of Education "advised the court it will not require Parker to lead the pledge of allegiance". Parker and Wirin dropped the suit on October 4, 1963.

===== 2003 District ruling =====
Teachers or any other staff also cannot be forced to participate in the pledge. In the case of Lane v. Owens, three teachers and six students sued the Colorado state government over a 2003 law requiring daily recitation of the Pledge of Allegiance by students and teachers. Granting the plaintiffs a temporary restraining order, U.S. District Judge Lewis Babcock said: "It doesn't matter whether you're a teacher, a student, a citizen, an administrator, or anyone else, it is beyond the power of the authority of government to compel the recitation of the Pledge of Allegiance". Colorado subsequently amended the law to remove the requirement to recite the Pledge in 2004.

=== 2005 District ruling ===
In early 2005, Dr. Michael Newdow brought a new lawsuit on behalf of himself and others. On September 14, 2005, U.S. District Judge Lawrence Karlton ruled that it violated the Establishment Clause for public schools to lead their students in the Pledge of Allegiance to comply with California's requiring the recitation of the Pledge of Allegiance. The judge said he was bound by 2002 precedent of the 9th U.S. Circuit Court of Appeals decision even though it had been vacated by the Supreme Court. Judge Karlton held that the words "one nation under God" violate the right to be "free from a coercive requirement to affirm God".

On November 30, 2005, the Becket Fund for Religious Liberty, an organization claiming to defend religious rights for people of all faiths, appealed the case to the Ninth Circuit and filed a brief that declared, "[Intervenors] object to the ruling that the pledge violates any part of the Establishment Clause." Derek Gaubatz, director of Litigation for the Becket Fund, said his group would appeal the decision "if necessary to the Supreme Court to get that ruling reversed to secure the constitutionality of the pledge once and for all".

=== "Under God" ruling ===
The words "under God" were added to the Pledge on June 14, 1954, when then U.S. President Dwight D. Eisenhower signed a bill into law. At the time, Eisenhower stated that "From this day forward, the millions of our school children will daily proclaim in every city and town, every village and rural schoolhouse, the dedication of our Nation and our people to the Almighty."

The matter of the Pledge's constitutionality simmered for decades below the public eye. In 1992, the Chicago-based Seventh Circuit Court of Appeals decided the first challenge to the constitutionality of the words "under God", ruling in Sherman v. Community Consolidated School District 21 that the use of the words "under God" in the Pledge did not violate the Establishment Clause. On June 26, 2002, in a case (Newdow v. United States Congress) brought by an atheist father objecting to the Pledge being taught in his daughter's school, the Ninth Circuit Court of Appeals in San Francisco ruled the addition of "under God" an unconstitutional endorsement of monotheism.

Shortly after the ruling's release, Judge Alfred T. Goodwin, author of the opinion in the 2–1 ruling, signed an order staying its enforcement until the full Ninth Circuit court could decide whether to hear an appeal.

The day after the ruling, the Senate voted in favor of the Pledge as it stood. The House followed suit, accepting a similar resolution. The Senate vote was 99–0 (Senator Jesse Helms could not attend, but had been expected to vote "yes"); the House 416–3 with 11 abstaining. President George W. Bush and many other politicians spoke out in favor of the existing Pledge.

The stay on the ruling was lifted on February 28, 2003, when the full Ninth Circuit court of appeals decided not to take the case, letting the ruling stand. A second stay was granted, however, to give the school district time to appeal to the U.S. Supreme Court. If it had held, the court's ruling would have affected more than 9.6 million students in Alaska, Arizona, California, Hawaii, Idaho, Montana, Nevada, Oregon, Washington and Guam.

In the months following the court's decision, Attorneys General from all 50 states filed papers asking the Supreme Court of the United States to review the decision, 49 of whom joined a legal brief sponsored by Oklahoma Attorney General Drew Edmondson and Idaho Attorney General Lawrence Wasden. California filed a separate brief, also urging the Supreme Court to hear the case.

On January 12, 2004, the Supreme Court agreed to hear the appeal on March 24 of the same year. Justice Antonin Scalia recused himself from the case after he had criticized the Ninth Circuit judgment in the Newdow case. On June 14, 2004, the Supreme Court rejected Newdow's claim by an 8–0 vote, stating that as a non-custodial parent, he did not have standing to act as his daughter's legal representative.

In August 2005, the United States Court of Appeals for the Fourth Circuit held 3–0 in Myers v. Loudoun County Public Schools that teacher-led recitations of the Pledge did not violate the Establishment Clause. The Plaintiff in that case, Edward Myers, decided not to appeal the case to the Supreme Court.

=== General patterns in issues of church and state ===
The points-of-view, compromises, and personal interests in this matter are often viewed as examples of a wider debate over the role of religion in U.S. government.

Several dissenting Supreme Court Justices concluded that U.S. judges exceed their authority in decisions on issues of religion. Supreme Court Associate Justice Antonin Scalia wrote, and Chief Justice William Rehnquist agreed, that "the Court's position is the repressive one" when the Supreme Court approved of the lower courts declaring a law unconstitutional because it mandated that teaching of "evolution science" be balanced by teaching of "creation science." (Edwards v. Aguillard,). Justice Scalia has also said that courts have gone too far to keep religion out of public schools and other forums, and that the Pledge of Allegiance question would be better decided by lawmakers than judges. The Supreme Court has banned some expressions of "God" from public schools. For example, in 1962 the Supreme Court banned the teacher-led recitation of the invocation, "Almighty God, we acknowledge our dependence upon Thee, and we beg Thy blessings upon us, our parents, our teachers and our Country." This objectionable "Almighty God" recitation was voluntary, of the same nature as the Pledge of Allegiance.

In the same 1962 case, the Court admitted that the "God save this honorable court" invocation uttered at the beginning of each Court session was a "prayer." However, the Court also ruled that "A religion is not established in the usual sense merely by letting those who choose to do so say the prayer that the public school teacher leads." Rather, the Court found fault with the teacher-led prayer because the State of New York had financed a religious exercise in requiring the teacher-led recitation of the prayer. Nevertheless, neither the parents nor the Court made the same assertion regarding the Pledge of Allegiance.

=== Definition of "religious exercise" ===
The dissenting judge, Ferdinand Fernandez, in the 2002 "Under God" ruling stated that the ruling conflicted with the Supreme Court's explicit stance that the phrase "under God" is merely a ceremonial reference to history and not an affirmation of religious faith. Opponents contend that this contradicts the 1954 House Report of the legislators who inserted the "under God" phrase into the Pledge, which stated that the words "under God" served to "acknowledge the dependence of our people and our Government upon the moral directions of the Creator." 154 U.S.C.A.A.N 2339, 2340.

The plaintiff, Michael Newdow, an atheist, took issue with the phrase "In God We Trust" on the coins of American currency, believing that the phrase was a state-sponsored statement of religious faith—illegal under the separation of church and state. He argued that he had a right to raise his daughter "without God being imposed into her life by her school teachers."

Some of the judges in the 2002 ruling agreed that Newdow had a right to direct the religious education of his daughter. Newdow explained his view of 'freedom of religious exercise' by asking whether Christians would be glad if the atheists were in the majority and if the atheists inserted into the pledge of allegiance the phrase "one nation under NO God." In an interview with Connie Chung, Newdow stated, "The Constitution says the congress will make no laws respecting an establishment of religion which means that the Supreme Court says, and as you have said, nobody should be made to feel like an outsider. And I would only ask everyone of those people to ask themselves, if they had to say every morning when they pledged allegiance to the flag, that we were one nation under Sun Myung Moon, or one nation under David Koresh, or one nation under Jesus, or one nation under Mohammad, how would they feel?" Thus Newdow claimed that the reference to God is meaningful, and hence the court should recognize, and correct, the resulting religious bias.

== Connection with socialism ==
Francis Bellamy (1855–1931), the author of the Pledge, was a Baptist minister, a well-known Christian socialist, and the cousin of Edward Bellamy, one of the most renowned socialists of the late 19th century. Francis was known for his work in the slums of Boston, and preached that Jesus was a socialist. His views resulted in his losing the position he held in a Boston church. Bellamy also believed that the promise of America was being betrayed by the rampant capitalism, materialism and individualism of the Gilded Age. When provided with the opportunity in 1892 to write a pledge to the American flag, Bellamy turned to some of the words and principles of socialism to help promote a collective moral vision.

Initially, Bellamy intended to use the French Revolutionary phrase "liberty, equality and fraternity" (liberté, égalité, fraternité), but came to the conclusion that it would not be acceptable to many Americans. Instead, he invented the phrase "one nation indivisible with liberty and justice for all" as an exemplar of American egalitarian secular patriotism. He wanted students across the country to recite the Pledge simultaneously, and thought that such an event would help promote free public education.

Anarcho-Capitalist economist Thomas DiLorenzo argues in his essay Pledging Allegiance to the Omnipotent Lincolnian State, that The Pledge promotes a Post-Civil War Centralist ideology opposed to the Founding Fathers decentralized vision, and claims the ritual solely exists to foster loyalty to the federal government. DiLorenzo highlights Bellamy’s socialist background, arguing the Pledge represents a step toward socialism.

== Compelled speech and other issues ==
Some people generally oppose the pledge because they feel that the mandatory recital of what amounts to an oath, particularly by children, led by government employees in public schools, is a form of compulsory speech, amounting to indoctrination, that is the antithesis of the liberty the flag itself represents. Indeed, in Barnette, Justices Black and Douglas wrote in a concurring opinion, "Words uttered under coercion are proof of loyalty to nothing but self-interest. Love of country must spring from willing hearts and free minds, inspired by a fair administration of wise laws enacted by the people's elected representatives within the bounds of express constitutional prohibitions." Likewise, the majority opinion by Justice Robert Jackson, included one of the great statements in American constitutional law and history, stated: "If there is any fixed star in our constitutional constellation, it is that no official, high or petty, can prescribe what shall be orthodox in politics, nationalism, religion, or other matters of opinion or force citizens to confess by word or act their faith therein."

Specific criticisms of the pledge include:

- The assertion that it amounts to idolatry
- That the noble ideal of liberty and justice for all it espouses, ignores and overlooks historical and current issues such as the prison population, American internment camps during WWII, and wrongful convictions and executions
- Perceived encroachments on First and Fourteenth Amendment freedoms
- That it encourages blind patriotism at the expense of actual civic engagement and action

=== 2006 District ruling ===
- In the 2006 Florida case Frazier v. Alexandre, No. 05-81142 (S.D. Fla. May 31, 2006), "A federal district court in Florida ruled that a 1942 state law requiring students to stand and recite the Pledge of Allegiance violates the First and Fourteenth Amendments of the U.S. Constitution, even though the law allows students to opt out, because they can only do so with written parental permission and are still required to stand during the recitation. Cameron Frazier, a student at Boynton Beach High School, was removed from a class after he refused to follow his teacher's instructions to recite the Pledge or stand during recitation."
