= Anderson v. United States =

- Supreme Court of the United States

Decided March 1, 1943
- Full case name: Anderson v. United States
- Citations: 318 U.S. 350 (more)

Holding
- The violation of state law rendered the confession evidence inadmissible. If there is a "working arrangement" where state officials will violate the rights of the accused and federal officials will charge them federally, the fact that the federal officers did not personally violate the law is immaterial to a confession's admissibility.

Court membership
- Chief Justice Harlan F. Stone Associate Justices Owen Roberts · Hugo Black; Stanley F. Reed · Felix Frankfurter; William O. Douglas · Frank Murphy; Robert H. Jackson · Wiley B. Rutledge

Case opinions
- Majority: Frankfurter
- Dissent: Reed
- Jackson, Rutledge took no part in the consideration or decision of the case.

Anderson v. United States, 318 U.S. 350 (1943), was a United States Supreme Court case in which the Court held that the violation of state law rendered the confession evidence inadmissible. If there is a "working arrangement" where state officials will violate the rights of the accused and federal officials will charge them federally, the fact that the federal officers did not personally violate the law is immaterial to a confession's admissibility.

== Lone dissenter ==
Justice Stanley F. Reed was the only dissenter, but he did not write a separate opinion. For context, Reed was also the only dissenter in the earlier case, McNabb v. United States, where he objected strenuously to the idea that the courts should exercise supervisory authority over the police in this way. He expressed concern that technical requirements would result in criminals escaping punishment.

== See also ==
- McNabb v. United States
