= Fred Fisher Music Co. v. M. Witmark & Sons =

- Supreme Court of the United States

Argued January 14–15, 1943 Decided April 5, 1943
- Full case name: Fred Fisher Music Co. v. M. Witmark & Sons
- Citations: 318 U.S. 643 (more) 63 S. Ct. 773; 87 L. Ed. 1055

Holding
- The renewal of copyright for the second term is not an opportunity for an author to renegotiate terms made during the first term that extended beyond the first term's length.

Court membership
- Chief Justice Harlan F. Stone Associate Justices Owen Roberts · Hugo Black; Stanley F. Reed · Felix Frankfurter; William O. Douglas · Frank Murphy; Robert H. Jackson · Wiley B. Rutledge

Case opinions
- Majority: Frankfurter
- Dissent: Black, Douglas, Murphy
- Rutledge took no part in the consideration or decision of the case.
- Abrogated by
- Copyright Act of 1976

Fred Fisher Music Co. v. M. Witmark & Sons, 318 U.S. 643 (1943), was a United States Supreme Court case in which the Court held the renewal of copyright for the second term is not an opportunity for an author to renegotiate terms made during the first term that extended beyond the first term's length.

Justices Black, Douglas, and Murphy dissented from the decision, citing the lower court judge's opinion rather than composing their own.

The Copyright Act of 1976 abrogated this decision and assigned the decision of whether to renew to the original copyright holder.
