= Boake Carter =

American journalist

Harold Thomas Henry "Boake" Carter (28 September 1903 – 16 November 1944) was a British-American broadcast news commentator in the 1930s and early 1940s. One of the most important radio broadcasters of the 1930s, he was propelled to fame for his coverage of the Lindbergh kidnapping trial. Throughout the 1930s he became increasingly right-wing and isolationist until he was removed from air in mid-1938.

== Early life ==
Carter was born in Baku, Russian Empire, the son of British parents Thomas Carter and Edith Harwood-Yarred, from London and Leicestershire, respectively. His father worked for a British oil company. Carter would later claim his father had been in the British Consular Service (his father was the British Honorary Consul). Carter grew up in the United Kingdom, and enlisted in the Royal Air Force at the age of 15, serving with the RAF's Coast Patrol for eighteen months. He attended Tonbridge School from 1918 to 1921, and would later claim to have attended Christ's College in Cambridge. Carter arrived in the United States on September 25, 1921, after his father was assigned to Mexico.

== Career ==
Carter worked at the Philadelphia Daily News as a journalist. He entered broadcasting as a news commentator with WCAU in Philadelphia in 1930, initially as the announcer for a rugby game, getting the job by default as he was the only person WCAU's director knew who was familiar with the sport. His listeners complained about his accent, which he would afterwards change to sound more American. In 1931, he became the narrator for Hearst-Metrotone newsreels. Carter rose to fame as a broadcast journalist when he covered the Lindbergh kidnapping trial, beginning in 1932. He continued to work for WCAU, with his broadcasts distributed through the CBS network.

After achieving fame, Carter was a familiar radio voice, but his commentaries were controversial, notably his criticisms of Franklin D. Roosevelt's New Deal and the powerful Congress of Industrial Organizations. Carter was an accomplished salesman for the sponsor of his program from 1933 to 1938, Philco Radios, blending his reporting and commentary with plugs for the company's sets. He became a naturalized U.S. citizen in 1934.

In 1936, Carter had more listeners than any other radio commentator. In 1938 readers of Radio Guide voted him the most popular commentator in America. He also appeared in a Life magazine advertisement for Lucky Strike cigarettes. Carter published several books in the 1930s, and began writing a widely syndicated column (for the Ledger Syndicate) in 1937. In 1937, Carter's antagonism of the Congress of Industrial Organizations (CIO) led to a boycott of the program and Philco radios from the CIO, despite the fact that Philco radios were produced by CIO workers. Philco parted with Carter, and he was next sponsored by General Foods, who were then boycotted by the CIO.

By 1937, the Roosevelt White House already had three federal agencies investigating Carter. His praise for the Anschluss proved to be the final straw. In 1938, under pressure from Roosevelt's allies, including the CIO, Carter lost his WCAU job, was barred from CBS, and lost his General Foods sponsorship. With his removal, along with Charles Coughlin in 1939, there was no longer any popular radio commentator who opposed Roosevelt's foreign policy.

That year, Carter went on a speaking tour throughout the States. In 1939, he returned to radio with a thrice-weekly evening commentary on the Mutual Broadcasting System, adopting a pro-Roosevelt stance. Mutual gradually moved his broadcasts to less prominent time slots.

A newspaper article by Carter, published in the Cleveland News on March 25, 1939, claimed that "responsible statesmen of the world do not expect the recent events in Europe [e.g., the annexation of Austria and the Sudetenland by Nazi Germany] of themselves will produce a general European war .... despite all the scare headlines in America from day to day."

In the early 1940s, Carter was drawn into British Israelism by Moses Guibbory. He began keeping a kosher kitchen and changed his name to Ephraim Boake Carter.

== Death ==
Carter was almost a forgotten figure when he died of a heart attack in 1944 in Hollywood. A messy fight between his three former wives followed over his estate. Stewart Robb's The Strange Death of Boake Carter, published in 1946, suggested Boake was murdered, perhaps by Guibbory. In 1949, his final years were documented in a book, Thirty-Three Candles, by fellow cult adherent David Horowitz.
