= Hayden C. Covington =

American lawyer (1911–1978)

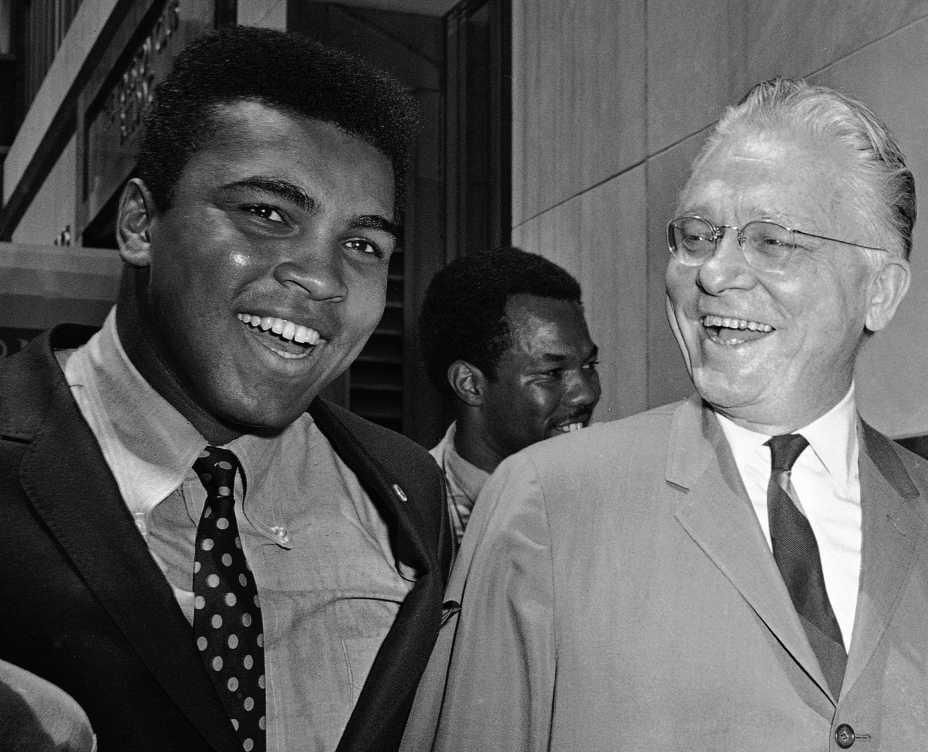
- Covington (right) with Muhammad Ali in 1967
- Born: January 19, 1911; East Texas, US
- Died: November 21, 1978 (aged 67); Brooklyn, New York, US
- Education: St. Mary's University School of Law (JD, 1933)
- Occupation: Lawyer
- Movement: Jehovah's Witnesses
- Spouse: Dorothy Mae Sennett (m. 1949)
- Children: 2

Hayden Cooper Covington (January 19, 1911 – November 21, 1978) was legal counsel for the Watch Tower Bible and Tract Society in the mid-20th century. He argued numerous cases before the United States Supreme Court on behalf of Jehovah’s Witnesses in defense of their religious freedoms, winning most of them. In 1967, he defended then world heavyweight champion Muhammad Ali in his legal battle against the draft during the Vietnam War.

== Early life ==
Covington was born in East Texas, and reared on a farm near Dallas, Texas. His father was a Texas Ranger.

An able student, Covington worked his way through law school in San Antonio, at the San Antonio Public School of Law, in its waning days before becoming St. Mary's University School of Law in 1934. He was admitted to the Texas Bar in 1933.

== Jehovah's Witnesses ==
Covington was first exposed to Jehovah's Witnesses through the broadcast sermons of Watch Tower Society President Joseph F. Rutherford on radio station KTSA in San Antonio. He was attracted to the group's teachings, and defended several of its members in Texas courts before being formally baptized as a member in 1934.

After Rutherford learned of Covington's successes defending Jehovah's Witnesses, he asked Covington to represent the Society for a case before the US Supreme Court. He was then invited to join the headquarters staff as general counsel in 1939, succeeding Olin R. Moyle.

When Rutherford died in January 1942, Covington maintained his aggressive litigation policy. Covington was elected vice-president of the Watch Tower Society, succeeding the newly elected president, Nathan H. Knorr, despite having been a Jehovah's Witness for only five years. Until 2000, appointment to the board of directors of the Watch Tower Society was almost exclusively limited to those professing to be of the "anointed class" who would "rule as Kings" in heaven with Christ, Covington being the only exception. A subsequent policy change resulted in Covington's resignation from the Vice Presidency and departure from the board in 1945; however, he remained on staff as legal counsel. In 1950, he wrote the Watch Tower tract, Defending and Legally Establishing the Good News to advise Witnesses of their constitutional rights in the United States.

Covington was subsequently recognized as one of the greatest civil liberties attorneys in American history. During his tenure as the head of the Watch Tower Society's legal department, he presented 111 petitions and appeals to the Supreme Court. He won exactly 37 (more than 80%) of the 44 cases he brought before the Court, involving issues including compulsory flag-salute statutes, public preaching and door-to-door literature distribution. He later resigned as head of the Watch Tower Society's legal department, and was eventually disfellowshipped after clashes with the Society's then-President Nathan Knorr and revelations of a drinking problem. He was reinstated less than a year later.

=== Cases argued before the Supreme Court ===
- Cantwell v. Connecticut, 310 U.S. 296 (1940)
- Cox v. New Hampshire, 312 U.S. 569 (1941)
- Chaplinsky v. New Hampshire, 315 U.S. 568 (1942)
- Jones v. City of Opelika, 316 U.S. 584 (1942)
- West Virginia State Board of Education v. Barnette, 319 U.S. 624 (1943)
- Martin v. City of Struthers, 319 U.S. 141(1943)
- Jamison v. State of Texas, 318 U.S. 413 (1943)
- Murdock v. Pennsylvania, 319 U.S. 105 (1943)
- Taylor v. State of Mississippi, 319 U.S. 583 (1943)
- Largent v. Texas, 318 U.S. 418 (1943)
- Follett v. Town of McCormick, 321 U.S. 573 (1944)
- Marsh v. Alabama, 326 U.S. 501 (1946)
- Tucker v. Texas, 326 U.S. 517 (1946)
- Saia v. New York, 334 U.S. 558 (1948)
- Niemotko v. Maryland, 340 U.S. 268 (1951)
- Fowler v. Rhode Island, 345 U.S. 67 (1953)
- Poulos v. New Hampshire, 345 U.S. 395 (1953)
- Dickinson v. United States, 346 U.S. 389 (1953)

=== Meeting with US President Harry Truman ===
In its chapter on Covington, Great American lawyers: An Encyclopedia relates:

Covington reported one meeting in which he and Knorr met with President Harry Truman about a pardon for a Witness who had been convicted of evading the draft. Covington claimed that Truman cursed and claimed to have no use "for that SOB who didn't want to die for his country in time of war."

That meeting apparently occurred on Friday, September 6, 1946. President Truman eventually pardoned 136 Jehovah's Witnesses who had been convicted in draft cases.

== Defense of Muhammad Ali ==
In 1966 and 1967, Covington—with his extensive experience in the US Selective Service System and his many successes representing Jehovah's Witnesses—assisted prize-fighter Muhammad Ali to obtain a draft exemption as a Muslim minister. Covington subsequently sued Ali to recover $247,000 in legal fees.

== See also ==
- United States Supreme Court cases involving Jehovah's Witnesses

== Sources ==
- Faith On The March. A.H. Macmillan, Prentice-Hall, Inc. 1957.
