= List of United States Supreme Court cases, volume 318 =

This is a list of all the United States Supreme Court cases from volume 318 of the United States Reports:

Case name	Citation	Date decided
Terminal R.R. Ass'n v. Trainmen	318 U.S. 1	1943
NLRB v. Ind. & Mich. Elec. Co.	318 U.S. 9	1943
O'Donnell v. Great Lakes Dredge & Dock Co.	318 U.S. 36	1943
Tileston v. Ullman	318 U.S. 44	1943
Mandeville v. Canterbury	318 U.S. 47	1943
In re Bradley	318 U.S. 50	1943
Tiller v. Atl. Coast Line R.R. Co.	318 U.S. 54	1943
Ziffrin v. United States	318 U.S. 73	1943
SEC v. Chenery Corp. (1943)	318 U.S. 80	1943
Jerome v. United States	318 U.S. 101	1943
Palmer v. Hoffman	318 U.S. 109	1943
United States v. Brooks-Callaway Co.	318 U.S. 120	1943
Overstreet v. N. Shore Corp.	318 U.S. 125	1943
C.J. Hendry Co. v. Moore	318 U.S. 133	1943
Reconstruction Fin. Corp. v. Bankers Tr. Co.	318 U.S. 163	1943
Smith v. Shaughnessy	318 U.S. 176	1943
Robinette v. IRS	318 U.S. 184	1943
Johnson v. United States	318 U.S. 189	1943
Leishman v. Associated Wholesale Elec. Co.	318 U.S. 203	1943
United States v. Okla. Gas & Elec. Co.	318 U.S. 206	1943
Fed. Sec. Adm'rs v. Quaker Oats Co.	318 U.S. 218	1943
Viereck v. United States	318 U.S. 236	1943
Marshall Field & Co. v. NLRB	318 U.S. 253	1943
Wells v. United States	318 U.S. 257	1943
Penn Dairies, Inc. v. Milk Control Comm'n	318 U.S. 261	1943
Pac. Coast Dairy, Inc. v. Dept. of Agric.	318 U.S. 285	1943
IRS v. Sabine Transp. Co.	318 U.S. 306	1943
Hoopeston Canning Co. v. Cullen	318 U.S. 313	1943
IRS v. Am. Dental Co.	318 U.S. 322	1943
McNabb v. United States	318 U.S. 332	1943
Anderson v. United States	318 U.S. 350	1943
Maricopa Cnty. v. Valley Nat'l Bank	318 U.S. 357	1943
Clearfield Tr. Co. v. United States	318 U.S. 363	1943
IRS v. Griffiths	318 U.S. 371	1943
Ex parte Davis	318 U.S. 412	1943
Jamison v. Texas	318 U.S. 413	1943
Largent v. Texas	318 U.S. 418	1943
Choctaw Nation v. United States	318 U.S. 423	1943
Corn Exch. Nat'l Bank & Tr. Co. v. Klauder	318 U.S. 434	1943
United States v. Swift & Co.	318 U.S. 442	1943
Ecker v. W. Pac. R.R. Corp.	318 U.S. 448	1943
Emil v. Hanley	318 U.S. 515	1943
Grp. of Inst'l Inv. v. Chi. M. St. P. & P.R.R. Co.	318 U.S. 523	1943
Ex parte Peru	318 U.S. 578	1943
IRS v. Sprouse	318 U.S. 604	1943
Fid. Assurance Ass'n v. Sims	318 U.S. 608	1943
Myers v. Matley	318 U.S. 622	1943
Creek Nation v. United States	318 U.S. 629	1943
Fred Fisher Music Co. v. M. Witmark & Sons	318 U.S. 643	1943
de Zon v. Am. President Lines, Ltd.	318 U.S. 660	1943
Ill. Com. Comm'n v. Thomson	318 U.S. 675	1943
New York ex rel. Whitman v. Wilson	318 U.S. 688	1943
IRS v. Chi. Stock Yards Co.	318 U.S. 693	1943
United States v. Lepowitch	318 U.S. 702	1943
Bd. of Cnty. Comm'rs v. Seber	318 U.S. 705	1943
Aguilar v. Standard Oil Co.	318 U.S. 724	1943
