= George MacPherson Docherty =

American minister

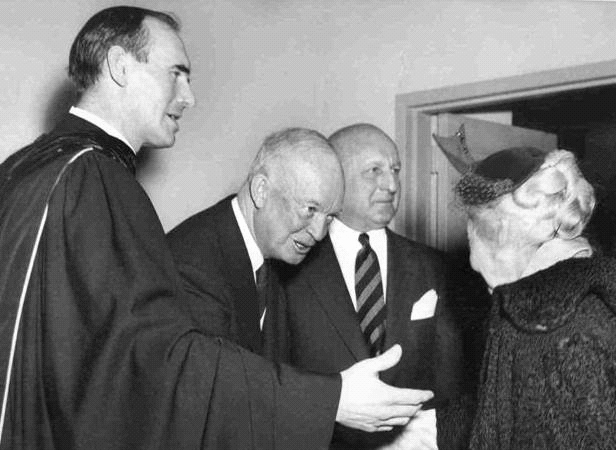
George Docherty (left) and President Eisenhower (second from left) on the morning of February 7, 1954, at the New York Avenue Presbyterian Church; the morning that Eisenhower was persuaded by Docherty that the Pledge of Allegiance must be amended to include the words, "under God."

George MacPherson Docherty (May 9, 1911 – November 27, 2008) was a Scottish-born American Presbyterian minister and principal initiator of the addition of the words "under God" to the Pledge of Allegiance to the Flag of the United States.

== Early life ==
Docherty was born in Glasgow, Scotland in 1911. After graduation from Glasgow University and a three-year pastorate at Aberdeen's North Kirk, he set sail from Southampton to the United States in 1950.

== Ministry ==
Docherty succeeded Peter Marshall as the pastor of the historic New York Avenue Presbyterian Church in Washington D.C., just a few blocks from the White House. Abraham Lincoln routinely attended church there while president. It was customary for later presidents to attend New York Avenue Presbyterian Church on "Lincoln Sunday," the Sunday nearest Lincoln's birthday, and sit in the pew that had been rented by Lincoln.

When President Dwight Eisenhower attended on Lincoln Sunday, February 7, 1954, Docherty preached a sermon calling for the addition of "under God" to the Pledge. As a result of his sermon, the next day President Eisenhower and his friends in Congress began to set the wheels in motion to amend the Pledge of Allegiance to include the phrase. On February 8, 1954, Representative Charles Oakman (R-Mich), introduced a bill to that effect.

Senator Homer Ferguson, in his report to the Congress, March 10, 1954, said that "the introduction of this joint resolution was suggested to me by a sermon given recently by the Rev. George M. Docherty, of Washington, D.C., who is pastor of the church at which Lincoln worshipped." This time Congress concurred with the Oakman-Ferguson resolution, and Eisenhower opted to sign the bill into law appropriately on Flag Day (June 14, 1954). The fact that Eisenhower clearly had Docherty's rationale in mind as he initiated and consummated this measure is apparent in a letter he wrote in August, 1954. Docherty's sermon was published by Harper & Bros. in New York in 1958 and President Eisenhower took the opportunity to write to Docherty with gratitude for the opportunity to once again read the fateful sermon.

Docherty continued at New York Avenue Presbyterian Church for 26 years. During that time he became active with Martin Luther King Jr. in the civil rights movement. He developed relationships with later Presidents, as well as noted theologians such as Karl Barth and Billy Graham. For 22 years, Docherty had a television program in Washington, D.C. A book of his sermons entitled, One Way of Living, was published by Harper in 1958, and his biography, I’ve Seen the Day, was published by Eerdmans in 1984. His sermon collection is now in the stewardship of the Robert E. Speer Library at Princeton Theological Seminary. A collection of original recordings of his early sermons are now in the care of the Harvard Divinity Library in Cambridge.

== Retirement and death ==
After retiring from New York Avenue Presbyterian Church in 1976, Docherty and his family moved back to Scotland. In 1979, he was asked to join the faculty of Juniata College in Huntingdon, Pennsylvania for a year. Several years later he would return again to Alexandria, Pennsylvania, near Huntingdon. Docherty died at his home in Alexandria on Thanksgiving Day, November 27, 2008.
