= Largent v. Texas =

Largent v. State of Texas
- Supreme Court of the United States

Argued February 12, 1943 Decided March 8, 1943
- Full case name: Largent v. State of Texas
- Citations: 318 U.S. 418 (more) 63 S. Ct. 667; 87 L. Ed. 873; 1943 U.S. LEXIS 890

Court membership
- Chief Justice Harlan F. Stone Associate Justices Owen Roberts · Hugo Black; Stanley F. Reed · Felix Frankfurter; William O. Douglas · Frank Murphy; Robert H. Jackson · Wiley B. Rutledge

Case opinion
- Majority: Reed, joined by Stone, Roberts, Black, Frankfurter, Douglas, Murphy, Jackson
- Rutledge took no part in the consideration or decision of the case.

Largent v. Texas, 318 U.S. 418 (1943), was a case involving Jehovah's Witnesses in which the Supreme Court of the United States held that a city ordinance of Paris, Texas, requiring permits in order to solicit orders for books is unconstitutional as applied to the distribution of religious publications. The church members were represented by Hayden C. Covington.

== See also ==
- Jamison v. State of Texas: A similar case in Dallas
- List of Supreme Court cases involving Jehovah's Witnesses
