= New York Avenue Presbyterian Church =

Church building in Washington, D.C., US

Coordinates: 38°54′0.13″N 77°1′51.53″W

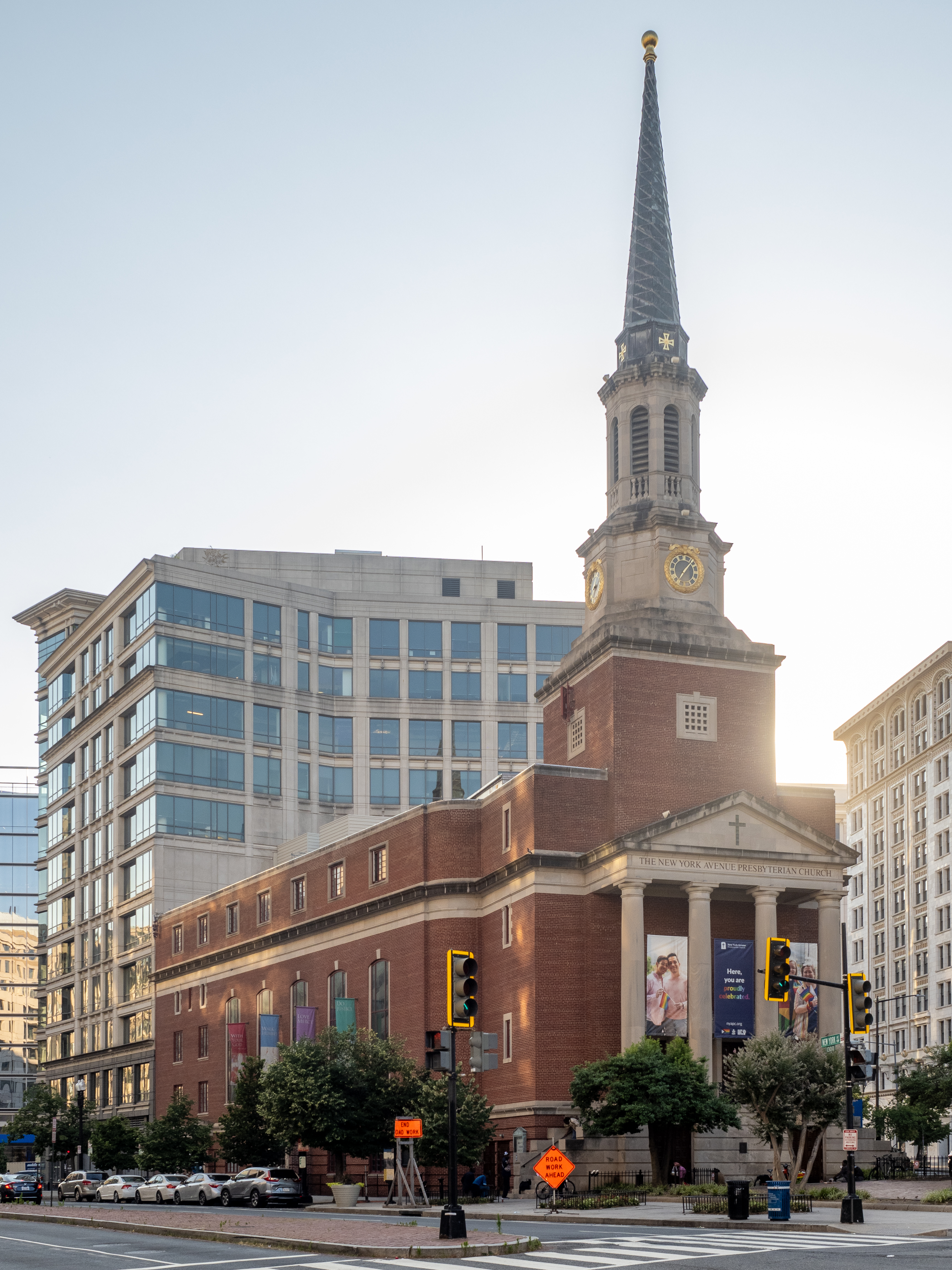
New York Avenue Presbyterian Church

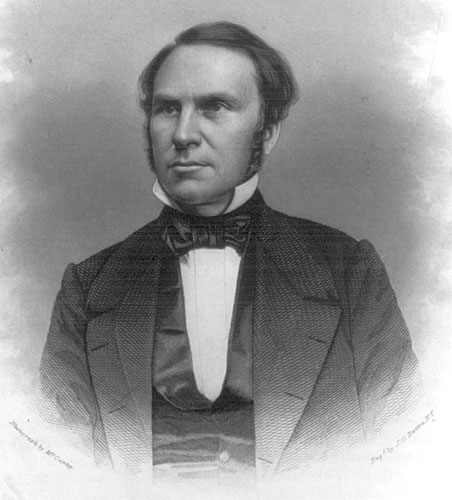
Phineas Densmore Gurley, the church's pastor from 1860 to 1868, was a spiritual advisor to President Abraham Lincoln

The New York Avenue Presbyterian Church in Washington, DC was formed in 1859–1860 but traces its roots to 1803 as the F Street Associate Reformed Presbyterian Church and another congregation founded in 1820 on its current site, the Second Presbyterian Church.

== Founding ==
The F Street Church was established in 1803 with James Laurie as pastor by leaders of the Associate Reformed movement, known as Covenanters, who had seceded from the Church of Scotland in the mother country and retained a separate identity in North America. After holding initial worship services in the U.S. Treasury building, in 1807 the congregation began meeting, still under the leadership of Dr. Laurie, in an imposing brick building that stood where the F Street entrance to the Willard Hotel today opens on to Peacock Alley—just two blocks from the church's present location on New York Avenue between 13th and 14th Streets, NW. The F Street Church, or Willard Hall, was one of the first buildings erected in Washington for Protestant worship. In 1824 Laurie led the congregation out of the Associate Reformed Presbyterian group to join the Presbyterian Church in the United States of America (PCUSA), which represented the mainstream of American Presbyterianism descended from the state-established Church of Scotland.

The Second Presbyterian Church, also a congregation of the PCUSA, was organized in 1820 by 16 families from the Bridge Street Presbyterian Church in Georgetown, which at the time was a separate town from the District of Columbia. These members found their church too distant for regular attendance over the often muddy streets connecting the White House area and Georgetown. Pastored until 1828 by the Rev. Daniel Baker, the Second Church congregation included three of the four candidates for president in 1824. Andrew Jackson’s wife described Baker as "a fine, plain preacher," and John Quincy Adams was an early pew holder as Secretary of State and ultimately served as a trustee.

In those days, Presbyterians were divided by the Old School–New School Controversy. The New School was ardently evangelistic and revivalist, and abandoned strict Calvinism for a theology of free will; the Old School was more doctrinally rigid and fearful of too much emotion. Second Church experienced an Old School/New School division, suffered financial hardship in covering the cost of its new building, and became involved in a scandal involving a member of President Jackson's cabinet. By the 1850s, it was barely functioning.

Finally, in 1859, the F Street Church, pastored by Rev. Dr. Phineas Densmore Gurley, an Old School Presbyterian who had been called in 1853 following Dr. Laurie's death, merged with Second Presbyterian to form the New York Avenue Presbyterian Church under Dr. Gurley.

The New York Avenue Presbyterian Church was named after the avenue that separated it from the tanyard on its south side. The new church expanded to include a new sanctuary and a gallery added later.

== Beliefs ==
=== Marriage ===
The church has an inclusive vision and celebrates both opposite-sex marriages and same-sex marriages. <

== Political influence ==
The church has historically been a location for public officials to engage. In addition to Adams, Jackson, and Lincoln, other Presidents attended services, including William Henry Harrison, James K. Polk, Franklin Pierce, James Buchanan, Andrew Johnson, Benjamin Harrison, Dwight David Eisenhower, and Richard Milhous Nixon, as well as members of Presidential Cabinets, Congress, and the Supreme Court.

Despite never joining, President Lincoln worshiped regularly at New York Avenue Presbyterian Church during the American Civil War. Lincoln rented a pew for $50 a year. Lincoln and Rev. Gurley developed a relationship in which they frequently discussed theology. Gurley presided over the funeral of Lincoln's son, William Wallace Lincoln, in 1862, and then over the funeral of Lincoln himself in 1865. Rev. Gurley had an "insider's" perspective of Lincoln's faith, and reported it as follows:

"I have had frequent and intimate conversations with him on the Subject of the Bible and the Christian religion, when he could have had no motive to deceive me, and I considered him sound not only on the truth of the Christian religion but on all its fundamental doctrines and teachings. And more than that, in the latter days of his chastened and weary life, after the death of his son Willie, and his visit to the battlefield of Gettysburg, he said, with tears in his eyes, that he had lost confidence in everything but God, and that he now believed his heart was changed, and that he loved the Savior, and, if he was not deceived in himself, it was his intention soon to make a profession of religion."

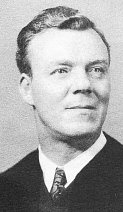
Peter Marshall

The Rev. Peter Marshall preached many widely publicized sermons from the church's pulpit during World War II. In the late 1940s, Marshall was appointed Senate chaplain. The book and feature film, A Man Called Peter, depict Marshall's years at the church.

The Rev. Dr. George MacPherson Docherty preached a Lincoln Day sermon on February 7, 1954, to a congregation that included President Eisenhower. The sermon, titled "A New Birth of Freedom," is credited with prompting the U.S. Congress to amend the Pledge of Allegiance to the Flag of the United States, inserting the phrase Lincoln used at Gettysburg, "under God."

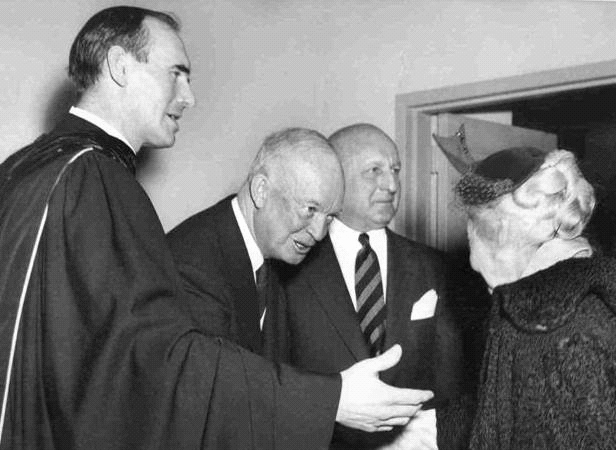
Rev. Dr. George Docherty (left) and President Eisenhower (second from left) on the morning of February 7, 1954, at the New York Avenue Presbyterian Church

At the invitation of Dr. Docherty, the Rev. Martin Luther King Jr. spoke from New York Avenue's pulpit on February 6, 1968, warning about the consequences of the Vietnam War. Years later, the church twice served as a host for the Christian Witness for Peace for Iraq in its efforts to call into question the war there.

NYAPC pastors Dr. Docherty and the Rev. Jack E. McClendon, traveled to Selma to march for civil rights with Dr. King in 1965. The church hosted protestors of the Vietnam War and was the center for publicity and public information for the Poor People’s Campaign in Washington in the spring of 1968. Since January 2009, the church has hosted hospitality days during large public gatherings, including the inaugurations of President Barack Obama and President Donald Trump, the Women's March and Black Lives Matter 2020 protests.

For many years, the church has hosted the Jewish High Holiday celebrations of Havurah. These services, which are free and open to all, annually draw hundreds from in and around the city.

== Urban ministry ==
In the 1960s and 70s, NYAPC created several programs for Washington, D.C.'s junior high and high school students, people experiencing homelessness, and mental health patients. Approximately 1,200 people come to the building on a weekly basis for Community Club tutoring, AA meetings, mental health services through McClendon Center or Downtown Day Services center or worship services. New York Avenue’s pastor and members serve in the community as active participants in the Washington Interfaith Network (WIN), a local advocacy organization.

The church also extends beyond the boundaries of the metro region and the nation in many ways, but particularly through support—financial and otherwise—for a program for orphans sponsored by the Presbyterian Church in Njoro, Kenya, and a partnership with First Presbyterian-Reformed Church of Havana, Cuba. For several years, First Havana and New York Avenue’s congregations have reached out to one another, developing friendships and, more recently as downtown churches in capital cities, intentionally modeling reconciliation for their respective nations.

In January 2010, the church inaugurated a new, 3-manual, 63-rank Schlueter pipe organ, with the dedicatory concert performed by virtuoso organist Douglas Major.

Rev. Gench became pastor and head of staff in 2002 and retired in June 2019. In September 2019, Dr. Rev Heather Shortlidge became New York Avenue's transitional pastor, while the church's Pastor Nominating Committee (PNC) searches for a permanent senior pastor.
