= Tileston v. Ullman =

- Supreme Court of the United States

Argued January 13–14, 1943 Decided February 1, 1943
- Full case name: Tileston v. Ullman
- Citations: 318 U.S. 44 (more) 63 S. Ct. 493; 87 L. Ed. 603; 1943 U.S. LEXIS 986

Case history
- Prior: 129 Conn. 84, 26 A.2d 582 (1942)

Holding
- Connecticut anticontraception statute valid

Court membership
- Chief Justice Harlan F. Stone Associate Justices Owen Roberts · Hugo Black; Stanley F. Reed · Felix Frankfurter; William O. Douglas · Frank Murphy; Robert H. Jackson

Case opinion
- Per curiam

Tileston v. Ullman, 318 U.S. 44 (1943), was a United States Supreme Court case.

== Procedural history ==
The Supreme Court of Errors Connecticut held that §§ 6246 and 6562 of the Connecticut General Statutes of 1930 which prohibited the use of drugs or instruments to prevent conception and the giving of assistance or counsel in their use were constitutional. The Supreme Court of the United States assumed without first determining if the case was an appropriate one for a declaratory judgment, ruled that the statutes "prohibit the action proposed to be done" by appellant and "are constitutional."

== Facts ==
The Appellee claimed that the appellant, a physician, committed such an offense for giving professional advice concerning the use of contraceptives to three patients whose condition of health was such that their lives would be endangered by child-bearing. The appellant contended that because of the nature of his patients' exceptional condition in light of the danger child-bearing could pose for them that this was a just reason for the advice to be authorized and necessary. However, his complaint contained no allegations asserting any claim under the Fourteenth Amendment of infringement of appellant's liberty or his property rights. The relief prayed was a declaratory judgment as to whether the statutes are applicable to appellant and, if so, whether they constitute a valid exercise of constitutional power "within the meaning and intent of Amendment XIV of the Constitution of the United States prohibiting a state from depriving any person of life without due process of law."

== Significance ==
The sole constitutional attack upon the statutes in question were under the Fourteenth Amendment and confined the physician's contention for depravity of life—not appellant's but his patients'. Thus, the life of the appellant himself was not in danger. No genuine case or controversy essential to the exercise of the jurisdiction of the Court for this subject-matter existed until Griswold v. Connecticut.

== Holding ==
The Supreme Court held that the proceedings in the state courts presented no constitutional question which appellant had standing to assert. No question was raised as to the applicability and constitutionality of the statutes in their application to the physician in respect to deprivation of liberty or property in contravention of the Fourteenth Amendment. However, the court did not speak to whether it had jurisdiction to enforce a law that prevents the use of contraceptives for the state of Connecticut.
