= McNabb v. United States =

- Supreme Court of the United States

Argued October 22, 1942 Decided March 1, 1943
- Full case name: Benjamin McNabb, Freeman McNabb, and Raymond McNabb v. United States
- Citations: 318 U.S. 332 (more) 63 S.Ct. 608, 87 L.Ed. 819

Case history
- Prior: 123 F.2d 848 (6th Cir. 1941); cert. granted, 316 U.S. 658
- Subsequent: Rehearing denied, 319 U.S. 784 (1943). Retried and convicted; affirmed, 142 F.2d 904 (6th Cir. 1944); cert. denied, 323 U.S. 771 (1944).

Court membership
- Chief Justice Harlan F. Stone Associate Justices Owen Roberts · Hugo Black; Stanley F. Reed · Felix Frankfurter; William O. Douglas · Frank Murphy; Robert H. Jackson · Wiley B. Rutledge

Case opinions
- Majority: Frankfurter, joined by Stone, Roberts, Black, Douglas, Murphy, Jackson
- Dissent: Reed
- Rutledge took no part in the consideration or decision of the case.

McNabb v. United States, 318 U.S. 332 (1943), was a United States Supreme Court case. The court held that the defendants' confessions were inadmissible as evidence after the government's disregard of the requirement to bring them promptly before a judge or magistrate.

McNabb was the first decision to rely on the Supreme Court's supervisory power over lower federal courts. That is, it was not decided on the basis of constitutional rights, nor on any statute explicitly prohibiting the evidence from being used, but on the inherent authority of the court.

The evidentiary rule developed through McNabb and Mallory v. United States (1957) became known as the McNabb–Mallory rule. Since it is not a constitutional rule, it does not apply to states. Its applicability has been narrowed by Congress, but not eliminated, as the court held in Corley v. United States (2009).

== Background ==
The case was about the murder of a federal agent during a law enforcement operation targeting illicit untaxed whiskey. After fleeing the scene, Freeman and Raymond McNabb were arrested in the early morning of the night of the murder; Benjamin McNabb turned himself in the next morning. All were subjected to lengthy questioning over a couple of days. Benjamin confessed that he fired the fatal shot, during a five or six hour interrogation. Freeman and Raymond also made admissions implicating themselves in the crime. Based on each of their admissions, they were found guilty in a jury trial, and their convictions were affirmed on appeal.

== Supreme Court ==
In the Supreme Court, the McNabbs argued that their admissions were not voluntary, though the court did not decide that question. Instead, sua sponte, the court focused on the statutory requirement to bring them promptly before a judge or magistrate. The court, in an opinion by Justice Felix Frankfurter, found that there was a "flagrant disregard" of this procedure. Although Congress did not specify that exclusion of evidence would be the consequence, the court concluded that such exclusion was necessary to protect Congress's policy. The court said that "judicial supervision of the administration of criminal justice in the federal courts implies the duty of establishing and maintaining civilized standards of procedure and evidence", beyond the historical minimum of due process.

Justice Stanley F. Reed, the lone dissenter, argued that voluntariness should be the test and the court should not go beyond it.

== Subsequent history and additional facts of the case ==
The district court's record did not mention when the McNabbs were arraigned; this led the Supreme Court to conclude, mistakenly, that they were not brought before a magistrate throughout their arrests and questioning. After the Supreme Court decision, the government presented evidence that the McNabbs were arraigned shortly after they were taken into custody. The defendants were convicted in the retrial, and the court of appeals affirmed.
