= Minersville School District v. Gobitis =

- Supreme Court of the United States

Argued April 25, 1940 Decided June 3, 1940
- Full case name: Minersville School District, Board of Education of Minersville School District, et al. v. Walter Gobitis, et al.
- Citations: 310 U.S. 586 (more) 60 S. Ct. 1010; 84 L. Ed. 1375; 1940 U.S. LEXIS 1136; 17 Ohio Op. 417; 127 A.L.R. 1493

Case history
- Prior: Judgment for plaintiffs, injunction granted, 24 F. Supp. 271 (E.D. Pa. 1938); affirmed, 108 F.2d 683 (3d Cir. 1939); cert. granted, 309 U.S. 645 (1940).
- Subsequent: None

Holding
- The First Amendment does not require States to excuse public school students from saluting the American flag and reciting the Pledge of Allegiance on religious grounds.

Court membership
- Chief Justice Charles E. Hughes Associate Justices James C. McReynolds · Harlan F. Stone; Owen Roberts · Hugo Black; Stanley F. Reed · Felix Frankfurter; William O. Douglas · Frank Murphy

Case opinions
- Majority: Frankfurter, joined by Hughes, McReynolds, Roberts, Black, Reed, Douglas, Murphy
- Dissent: Stone

Laws applied
- U.S. Const. amends. I, XIV
- Overruled by
- West Virginia State Board of Education v. Barnette, 319 U.S. 624 (1943)

Minersville School District v. Gobitis, 310 U.S. 586 (1940), was a decision by the Supreme Court of the United States restricting the religious rights of public school students under the First Amendment to the United States Constitution. The Court ruled that public schools could compel students—in this case, Jehovah's Witnesses—to salute the American flag and recite the Pledge of Allegiance despite the students' religious objections to these practices. This decision led to increased persecution of Witnesses in the United States. The Supreme Court overruled this decision three years later in West Virginia State Board of Education v. Barnette (1943).

Subsequent cases have applied a lower standard of review to generally applicable laws when evaluating free exercise claims; Justice Antonin Scalia cited Felix Frankfurter's Gobitis opinion at least three times in Employment Division v. Smith (1990).

== Background ==
=== Jehovah's Witnesses and compulsory flag pledges ===
Mandatory flag pledges in public schools were motivated by patriotic fervor in the wartime United States. The first known mandatory flag pledges were instituted in a number of states during the Spanish–American War. During World War I, many more states instituted mandatory flag pledges with only a few dissents recorded by the American Civil Liberties Union.

On June 3, 1935, Watch Tower Society president J. F. Rutherford was interviewed at a Witness convention about "the flag salute by children in school". He told the convention audience that to salute an earthly emblem, ascribing salvation to it, was unfaithfulness to God. Rutherford said that he would not do it. While the matter was not yet established doctrine or written policy of Jehovah's Witnesses, at least some Witness families quickly made a personal conscientious decision on the matter.

In September in Lynn, Massachusetts, a third-grader and a Jehovah's Witness named Carleton Nichols refused to recite the Pledge of Allegiance and was expelled from school. The Nichols incident received widespread media attention, and other Witness students soon followed suit. Rutherford gave a radio address praising Nichols, and schools around the country began expelling Witness students and firing Witness teachers. Jehovah's Witnesses published the booklet Loyalty, making the matter an official doctrine of the faith before the end of 1935. Witnesses hired teachers and set up "Kingdom schools" to continue their children's education.

The national leadership subsequently decided to make an issue of the forced pledges and asked people to stand up for their right to religious freedom.

=== Facts of the case ===
Walter Gobitas had recently converted to Jehovah's Witnesses. Gobitas was inspired by stories of other Witnesses who challenged the system and suffered for it, and decided to make a stand himself and instructed his children not to pledge allegiance when at school.

Minersville, Pennsylvania, was predominantly Roman Catholic and there was significant animosity towards Jehovah's Witnesses. Tensions were already high before this case arose, and many viewed this as one way to get back at the Witnesses. As a result, the Gobitas children were subjected to teasing, taunting, and attacks from the other kids. For Lillian, this meant giving up her status as class president and losing most of her friends. "When I'd come to school," she said, "they would throw a hail of pebbles and yell things like, 'Here comes Jehovah!'" Billy's fifth-grade teacher attempted to physically force his arm out of his pocket to make the requisite salute.

A local Catholic church started a boycott of the family store and its business dropped off. Because of their eventual expulsion, their father had to pay for them to enroll in a private school, resulting in even more economic hardship.

At first, the school board was in a quandary because the law did not provide penalties for those who refused to pledge. Finally, though, the school board got permission to punish the Gobitas children and expelled them, without appeal.

=== Trial ===
The case was argued in Philadelphia on February 15, 1938. During the trial, school superintendent Roudabush displayed contempt for the beliefs of the children, stating that he felt they had been "indoctrinated" and that the existence of even a few dissenters would be "demoralizing", leading to widespread disregard for the flag and American values. Four months later District Judge Albert B. Maris found that the board's requirement that the children salute the flag was an unconstitutional violation of their free exercise of religious beliefs.

=== Third Circuit ===
Within two weeks, the school board unanimously agreed to appeal the decision. Oral arguments in the appeal were made before the Third Circuit of the U.S. Court of Appeals on November 9, 1938. One year later, the three-judge court unanimously affirmed the district court decision.

Despite its two defeats in the lower courts, the school board decided to take its case to the Supreme Court, authorizing its attorney to file a petition for a writ of certiorari, which the Court granted on March 4, 1940.

=== Oral argument ===
The Court heard oral arguments on April 25. Joseph Rutherford, president of the Watch Tower Society, and himself a lawyer, took over the defense, assisted by the new head of the religious group's Legal Department, Hayden Covington. The ACLU and the Committee on the Bill of Rights of the American Bar Association filed amicus curiae briefs.

== Opinion of the court ==
The Court's June 3 decision was nearly unanimous: only Justice Harlan F. Stone dissented. In an 8-to-1 decision, the Court upheld the mandatory flag salute, declining to make itself "the school board for the country."

Justice Felix Frankfurter wrote the majority decision; in doing so, he relied primarily on the "secular regulation" rule, which weighs the secular purpose of a nonreligious government regulation against the religious practice it makes illegal or otherwise burdens the exercise of religion. He identified the Pennsylvania flag-salute requirement as an intrinsically secular policy enacted to encourage patriotism among school children.

Frankfurter wrote that the school district's interest in creating national unity was enough to allow them to require students to salute the flag. According to Frankfurter, the nation needed loyalty and the unity of all the people. Since saluting the flag was a primary means of achieving this legitimate goal, an issue of national importance was at stake.

The Court held that the state's interest in "national cohesion" was "inferior to none in the hierarchy of legal values".

National unity is the basis of national security. To deny the legislature the right to select appropriate means for its attainment presents a totally different order of problem from that of the propriety of subordinating the possible ugliness of littered streets to the free expression opinion through handbills.

Weighing the circumstances in this case, he argued that the social need for conformity with the requirement was greater than the individual liberty claims of Jehovah's Witnesses. He emphasized that

Conscientious scruples have not, in the course of the long struggle for religious toleration, relieved the individual from obedience to a general law not aimed at the promotion or restriction of religious beliefs

Frankfurter further wrote that the recitation of a pledge advanced the cause of patriotism in the United States. He said the country's foundation as a free society depends upon building sentimental ties.

The flag, the Court found, was an important symbol of national unity and could be a part of legislative initiatives designed "to promote in the minds of children who attend the common schools an attachment to the institutions of their country."

=== Dissenting opinion ===
Harlan Stone, relying on the argument he had put forth in the famous Footnote Four, was the lone dissenter from the majority's decision, writing:

The guarantees of civil liberty are but guarantees of freedom of the human mind and spirit and of reasonable freedom and opportunity to express them ... The very essence of the liberty which they guarantee is the freedom of the individual from compulsion as to what he shall think and what he shall say ...

== Effects of the decision ==
On June 9, a mob of 2,500 burned the Kingdom Hall in Kennebunkport, Maine. On June 16, Litchfield, Illinois, law enforcement jailed all of that town's sixty Witnesses, ostensibly protecting them from their neighbors. On June 18, townspeople in Rawlins, Wyoming brutally beat five Witnesses; on June 22, the people of Parco, Wyoming tarred and feathered another.

The American Civil Liberties Union reported to the Justice Department that nearly 1,500 Witnesses were physically attacked in more than 300 communities nationwide. One Southern sheriff told a reporter why Witnesses were being run out of town: "They're traitors; the Supreme Court says so. Ain't you heard?"

First Lady Eleanor Roosevelt appealed publicly for calm, while newspaper editorials and the American legal community condemned the Gobitis decision as a blow to liberty. On June 8, 1942, Supreme Court Justices Black, Douglas and Murphy stated in their opinion on Jones v. City of Opelika that, although they had concurred with the majority in the Gobitis case, they now believed that that case had been wrongly decided.

== Subsequent history ==
Partly because of the violent reaction to its decision, including the lynching of Jehovah's Witnesses, the ruling did not stand for long. Frank Murphy in particular regretted his decision, and instructed his clerk to look out for an opportunity to revisit the issue. The elevation of Harlan Fiske Stone to Chief Justice, and the appointment of two new members to the Supreme Court, were also factors in the Court's reversal of policy.

On 14 June 1943 (Flag Day), the court handed down West Virginia State Board of Education v. Barnette. In addition to Murphy, Justices Black and Douglas also reversed their opinions, resulting in a 6–3 vote. The majority opinion written by Robert Jackson echoed Justice Stone's dissent when he wrote, "If there is any fixed star in our constitutional constellation, it is that no official, high or petty, can prescribe what shall be orthodox in politics, nationalism, religion or other matters of opinion".

The active persecution of Jehovah's Witnesses abated somewhat, although thousands were arrested during World War II for seeking religious exemption from military service. They were accused of being unpatriotic, and even of being Nazi sympathizers.

Subsequent cases have applied a lower standard of review to generally applicable laws when evaluating free exercise claims; Justice Antonin Scalia cited Frankfurter's Gobitis opinion at least three times in Employment Division v. Smith (1990) as if it had not been overruled.

== See also ==
- Knocking, a 2006 documentary on Jehovah's Witnesses that features Lillian and William Gobitas
