= Jamison v. Texas =

Jamison v. State of Texas
- Supreme Court of the United States

Argued February 12, 1943 Decided March 8, 1943
- Full case name: Jamison v. State of Texas
- Citations: 318 U.S. 413 (more) 63 S. Ct. 669; 87 L. Ed. 869; 1943 U.S. LEXIS 889

Court membership
- Chief Justice Harlan F. Stone Associate Justices Owen Roberts · Hugo Black; Stanley F. Reed · Felix Frankfurter; William O. Douglas · Frank Murphy; Robert H. Jackson · Wiley B. Rutledge

Case opinions
- Majority: Black, joined by Stone, Roberts, Reed, Douglas, Murphy, Jackson, Rutledge
- Concurrence: Frankfurter

Jamison v. State of Texas, 318 U.S. 413 (1943), was a case in which the Supreme Court of the United States held that a Dallas city ordinance, which prohibited distribution of handbills on the streets, violated the Free Exercise Clause of the First Amendment because the material being distributed is religious in its nature.

== Facts of the case ==
Jamison, a member of the Jehovah's Witnesses, was charged with distributing handbills on the streets of Dallas, Texas, in violation of an ordinance of that city which prohibits their distribution. She was convicted in the Corporation Court of Dallas, and appealed to the County Criminal Court where, after a new trial, she was again convicted and a fine of $5.00 and costs was imposed.

== Decision of the Court ==
Justice Black delivered the opinion of the Court: "The state can prohibit the use of the street for the distribution of purely commercial leaflets, even though such leaflets may have 'a civic appeal, or a moral platitude' appended. They may not prohibit the distribution of handbills in the pursuit of a clearly religious activity merely because the handbills invite the purchase of books for the improved understanding of the religion or because the handbills seek in a lawful fashion to promote the raising of funds for religious purposes."

== See also ==
- Largent v. Texas: A similar case in Paris, Texas
