= David Horowitz (author) =

American writer (1903–2002)

David Horowitz (1903–2002) was the founder of the U.S. based pan-religious organization United Israel World Union (UIWU). He was one of eight children of Cantor Aaron and Bertha Horowitz, who immigrated to the United States in 1914. In 1924, he emigrated Mandatory Palestine as an ardent Zionist. Three years later he married and moved to Poland, where he lived with his wife's parents during her pregnancy and was involved in trying to rescue Jews in the early years of the Second World War. He returned to the U.S. in 1943, where he in 1944 became an accredited correspondent to the United Nations and founded the UIWU. The purpose of the UIWU is to preach a universal Hebraic faith for all humankind based on the Decalogue and the other universal commandments of the Torah.

In 1949, Horowitz published the book Thirty-Three Candles, about his involvement in the cult around the messianic claimant Moses Guibbory and the controversial radio commentator Boake Carter. In 1986, he wrote the biography "Pastor Charles Taze Russell: An Early American Christian Zionist", which details the pro-Zionism writings and sermons of the founder of the Jehovah's Witness movement.

In 2019, Ralph E. Buntyn, a close associate for 10 years and vice president of the UIWU, wrote a biography of Horowitz: The Book of David – David Horowitz: Dean of United Nations Press Corps and Founder United Israel World Union

== See also ==
- Ten Lost Tribes
