= West Virginia State Board of Education v. Barnette =

- Supreme Court of the United States

Argued March 11, 1943 Decided June 14, 1943
- Full case name: West Virginia State Board of Education, et al. v. Walter Barnette, et al.
- Citations: 319 U.S. 624 (more) 63 S. Ct. 1178; 87 L. Ed. 1628; 1943 U.S. LEXIS 490; 147 A.L.R. 674

Case history
- Prior: Injunction granted, 47 F. Supp. 251 (S.D. W. Va. 1942)

Holding
- The Free Speech Clause of the First Amendment prohibits public schools from forcing students to salute the American flag and say the Pledge of Allegiance.

Court membership
- Chief Justice Harlan F. Stone Associate Justices Owen Roberts · Hugo Black; Stanley F. Reed · Felix Frankfurter; William O. Douglas · Frank Murphy; Robert H. Jackson · Wiley B. Rutledge

Case opinions
- Majority: Jackson, joined by Stone, Black, Douglas, Murphy, Rutledge
- Concurrence: Black, Douglas
- Concurrence: Murphy
- Dissent: Frankfurter
- Dissent: Roberts, Reed

Laws applied
- U.S. Const. amends. I, XIV; W. Va. Code § 1734 (1941)
- This case overturned a previous ruling or rulings
- Minersville School District v. Gobitis (1940)

West Virginia State Board of Education v. Barnette, 319 U.S. 624 (1943), is a landmark decision by the United States Supreme Court holding that the First Amendment protects students from being forced to salute the American flag or say the Pledge of Allegiance in public school.

Barnette overruled a 1940 decision on the same issue, Minersville School District v. Gobitis, in which the Court had stated that the proper recourse for dissent was to try to change the public-school policy democratically.

This was a significant court victory for Jehovah's Witnesses, whose religion forbade them from saluting or pledging to symbols, including symbols of political institutions. However, this ruling relied on freedom of speech principles rather than freedom of religion.

== Background ==
In the 1930s, the president of the Watch Tower Bible and Tract Society of Pennsylvania, Joseph Franklin Rutherford, began objecting to state laws requiring school students to salute the flag as a means of instilling patriotism, and in 1936 he declared that baptized Jehovah's Witnesses who saluted the flag were breaking their covenant with God and were committing idolatry.

Children of Jehovah's Witnesses had been expelled from school and were threatened with exclusion for refusing to salute the American flag. One such expulsion resulted in the Supreme Court case Minersville School District v. Gobitis in 1940, in which the high court sided with school districts and advised dissenting parents to try to change procedures via standard political processes.

In 1942, the West Virginia Board of Education passed a regulation requiring schoolchildren to salute the flag. Recitation of the Pledge of Allegiance was also required. Failure to comply was considered "insubordination" and dealt with by expulsion; the expelled student would then be considered a delinquent, and their parents could be fined up to $50 ($985.20 in 2025) and jailed up to thirty days.

Marie and Gathie Barnett (whose surname was spelled incorrectly in the court papers) were Jehovah's Witnesses attending Slip Hill Grade School near Charleston, who were instructed by their father not to salute the flag or recite the pledge. They were expelled for their refusal. Their parents continued to send the girls to school each day, only for the school to send them back home.

The Barnett family filed suit in the District Court for the Southern District of West Virginia, alleging that the regulation violated the Equal Protection clause of the Fourteenth Amendment, and the freedoms of speech and religion under the First Amendment, The District Court enjoined enforcement against students. Due to the case's constitutional implications, the West Virginia School Board appealed directly to the United States Supreme Court.

== Arguments ==
At the Supreme Court, the School Board argued that the Barnetts raised no substantial federal question, and the Board's stance rested upon the Gobitis precedent. The Barnetts' attorney, Hayden Covington, referenced the frequent persecution of Jehovah's Witnesses via statutes like that in West Virginia, and argued that the Gobitis precedent should be overturned because it enabled states to pass discriminatory laws.

The American Bar Association and the American Civil Liberties Union filed amicus curiae briefs arguing that Gobitis was bad law and should be overruled.

== Supreme Court decision ==
The Court, in a 6–3 decision delivered by Justice Robert H. Jackson, held that it was unconstitutional for public schools to compel students to salute the flag. It thus overruled its decision in Minersville School District v. Gobitis three years earlier, finding that the flag salute was "a form of utterance" and "a primitive but effective means of communicating ideas", and therefore was speech to which the First Amendment applied. The Court wrote that any "compulsory unification of opinion" was doomed to failure and was antithetical to free speech values. In Jackson's words:

If there is any fixed star in our constitutional constellation, it is that no official, high or petty, can prescribe what shall be orthodox in politics, nationalism, religion, or other matters of opinion or force citizens to confess by word or act their faith therein.

Jackson intricately refuted the arguments that had been made in the Gobitis precedent. First, Jackson rejected the previous court's holding that the United States flag was a national symbol, stating that symbols are merely the prelude to speech, and that "a person gets from a symbol the meaning he puts into it, and what is one man's comfort and inspiration is another's jest and scorn". Second, Jackson rejected the holding that flag-saluting ceremonies were an appropriate way to build "cohesive sentiment" for national unity, warning that "Those who begin coercive elimination of dissent soon find themselves exterminating dissenters. Compulsory unification of opinion achieves only the unanimity of the graveyard."

On the Gobitis holding that those who disagreed with a school board's regulation should attempt to change it through political processes, Jackson argued that the conflict at issue was between authority and the individual, and that the Founding Fathers intended the Bill of Rights to protect minority rights from the whims of a majority. Jackson wrote:

The very purpose of a Bill of Rights was to withdraw certain subjects from the vicissitudes of political controversy, to place them beyond the reach of majorities and officials and to establish them as legal principles to be applied by the courts. One's right to life, liberty, and property, to free speech, a free press, freedom of worship and assembly, and other fundamental rights may not be submitted to vote; they depend on the outcome of no elections.

Justices Hugo Black and William O. Douglas wrote a concurring opinion to explain their reasons for changing their view from the prior Gobitis decision, in which both had joined the majority. In their concurring opinion, they expanded upon the futility of pledges and oaths as means to build patriotism. "Love of country must spring from willing hearts and free minds, inspired by a fair administration of wise laws enacted by the people's elected representatives within the bounds of express constitutional prohibitions."

=== Dissenting opinion ===
The Justice who had written the Gobitis ruling in 1940 – Felix Frankfurter – strongly disagreed with how that precedent was being overturned in the Barnette ruling. Frankfurter reinforced his holding in Gobitis that those who disagree with a law should attempt to change it through the political process, rather than break that law due to religious conscience. "Otherwise each individual could set up his own censor against obedience to laws conscientiously deemed for the public good by those whose business it is to make laws." Thus, Frankfurter believed that the Barnette majority overstepped in striking down the West Virginia law, which had been passed by elected legislators.

Frankfurter's dissent was written from the perspective of his own Jewish roots, showing sympathy for other persecuted religious minorities but taking an impartial legal and unconstitutional view of the dispute and exercising judicial restraint. Fellow Justices Owen Roberts and Frank Murphy advised Frankfurter to tone down the personal dimensions of his dissent, but he refused.

== Impact ==
The Supreme Court's ruling on Barnette is considered a crucial precedent on the freedoms established by the Bill of Rights and the risk of governments restricting them via discriminatory laws. It is considered to be a formative precedent on not just freedom of religion; but also on the matter of compelled speech, as governments attempt to coerce citizens into taking oaths when they would not do so under their own free will, particularly for religious reasons.

In a 2006 commemorative event cosponsored by the Justice Robert H. Jackson Center and the Supreme Court Historical Society, Supreme Court law clerks from the Barnette court were on a panel with the two eponymous Barnetts. Just as she and her sister had been in 1942, Gathie Barnett Edmonds noted that her own son was also sent to the principal's office for not saluting the flag.

== See also ==
- Criticism of the Pledge of Allegiance
