= Pledge of Allegiance =

Loyalty oath to the flag and republic of the U.S.

U.S. Pledge of Allegiance (Bellamy versions) (changes are bolded and underlined)

1892 (first version)
- "I pledge allegiance to my Flag and the Republic for which it stands, one nation, indivisible, with liberty and justice for all."

1892 to 1923 (early revision by Bellamy)
- "I pledge allegiance to my Flag and to the Republic for which it stands, one nation, indivisible, with liberty and justice for all."

1923 to 1924
- "I pledge allegiance to the Flag of the United States and to the Republic for which it stands, one nation, indivisible, with liberty and justice for all."

1924 to 1954
- "I pledge allegiance to the Flag of the United States of America and to the Republic for which it stands, one nation, indivisible, with liberty and justice for all."

1954 (current version, per 4 U.S.C. §4)
- "I pledge allegiance to the Flag of the United States of America, and to the Republic for which it stands, one nation under God, indivisible, with liberty and justice for all."

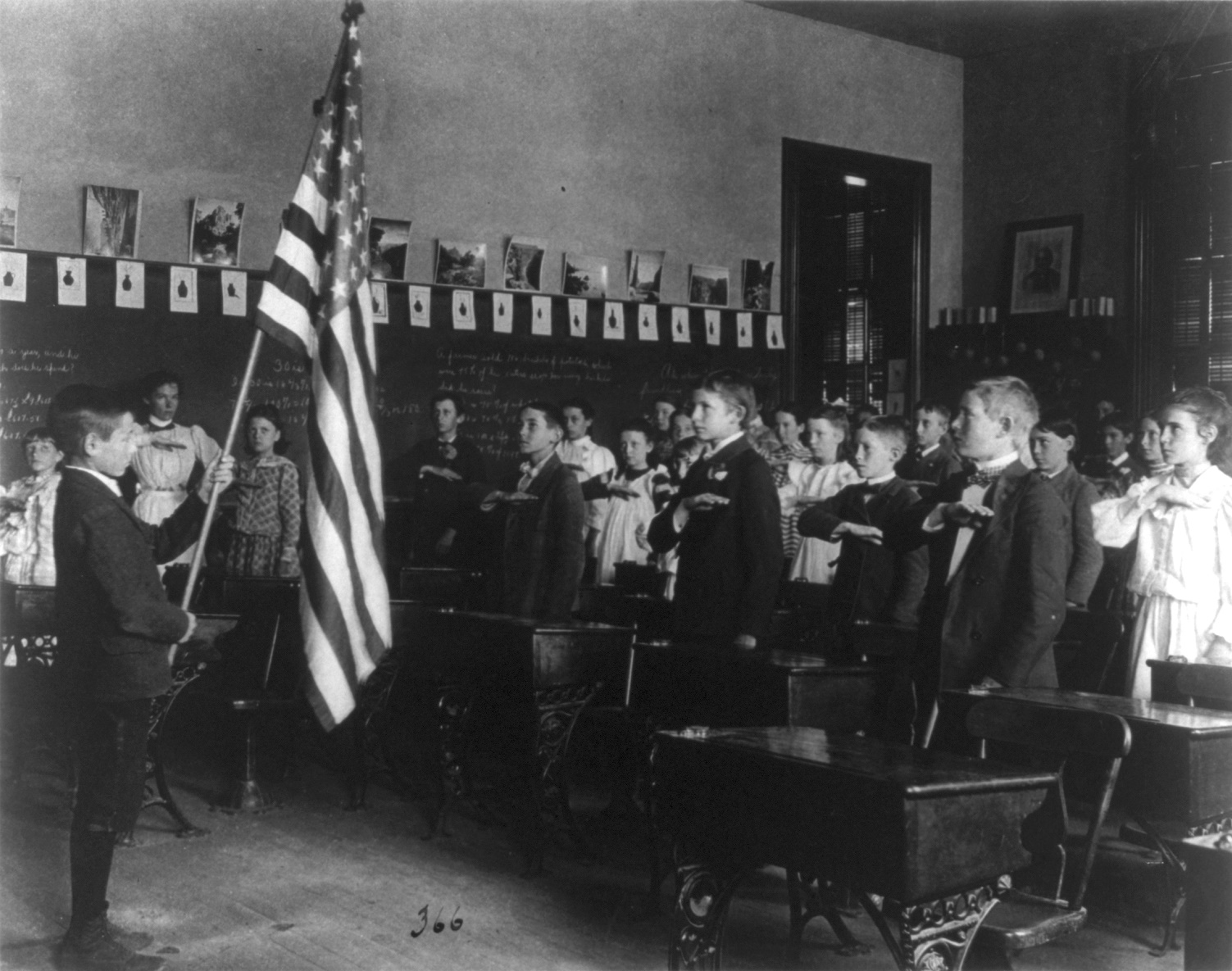
Schoolchildren in 1899 reciting the Pledge of Allegiance

The U.S. Pledge of Allegiance is a patriotic recited verse that promises allegiance to the flag of the United States and the republic of the United States. The first version was written in 1885 by Captain George Thatcher Balch, a Union army officer in the Civil War who later wrote a book on how to teach patriotism to children in public schools. In 1892, Francis Bellamy revised Balch's verse as part of a magazine promotion surrounding the World's Columbian Exposition, which celebrated the 400th anniversary of Christopher Columbus' arrival in the Americas.

Bellamy, the circulation manager for The Youth's Companion magazine, helped persuade then-president Benjamin Harrison to institute Columbus Day as a national holiday and lobbied Congress for a national school celebration of the day. The magazine sent leaflets containing part of Bellamy's Pledge of Allegiance to schools across the country and on October 21, 1892, over 10,000 children recited the verse together.

Bellamy's version of the pledge, though his authorship of it is contested, is largely the same as the one formally adopted by Congress 50 years later, in 1942. The official name of The Pledge of Allegiance was adopted in 1945. The most recent alteration of its wording came on Flag Day (June 14) in 1954, when the words "under God" were added by the 83rd United States Congress and signed into law by President Dwight D. Eisenhower.

== Recital ==
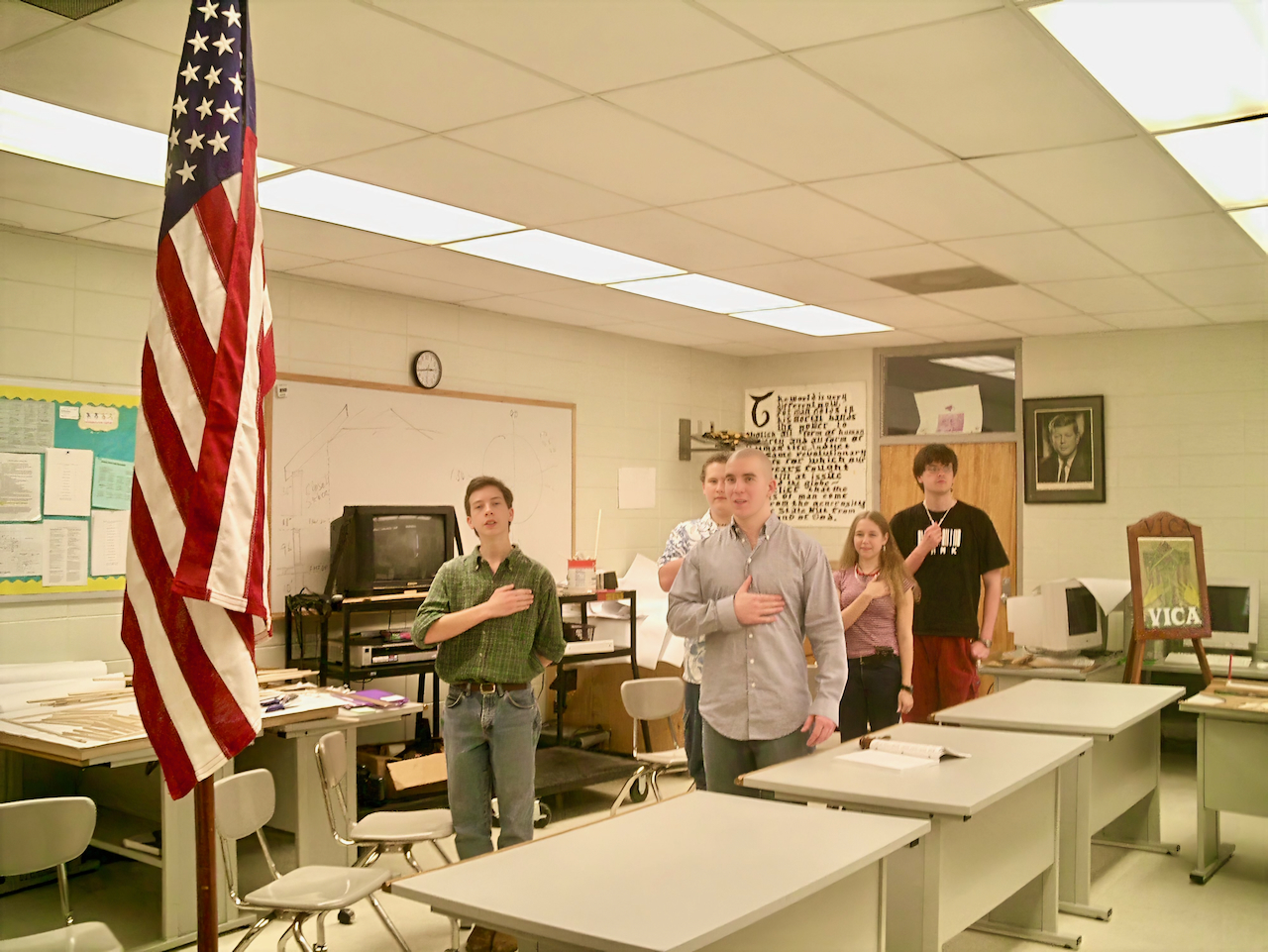
Students recite the Pledge of Allegiance at Hayesville High School in 2004

Congressional sessions open with the recital of the Pledge, as do many government meetings at local levels, and meetings held by many private organizations. All states except Nebraska, Hawaii, Vermont, and Wyoming require a regularly scheduled recitation of the pledge in public schools. Many states give a variety of exemptions from reciting the pledge, such as California which requires a "patriotic exercise" every day, which would be satisfied by the Pledge, but it is not enforced. The Supreme Court has ruled in West Virginia State Board of Education v. Barnette that students cannot be compelled to recite the Pledge, nor can they be punished for not doing so. In several states, state flag pledges of allegiance are required to be recited after the pledge to the American flag.

The current United States Flag Code says:

The Pledge of Allegiance to the Flag: "I pledge allegiance to the Flag of the United States of America, and to the Republic for which it stands, one Nation under God, indivisible, with liberty and justice for all," should be rendered by standing at attention facing the flag with the right hand over the heart. When not in uniform, men should remove any non-religious headdress with their right hand and hold it at the left shoulder, the hand being over the heart. Persons in uniform should remain silent, face the flag, and render the military salute. Members of the Armed Forces not in uniform and veterans may render the military salute in the manner provided for persons in uniform.

== Origins ==
Historians point to surges in American patriotic oaths and pledges to the flag after the Civil War, when tensions surrounding political loyalties persisted, and in the 1880s, as rates of immigration increased dramatically.

=== Balch pledge ===
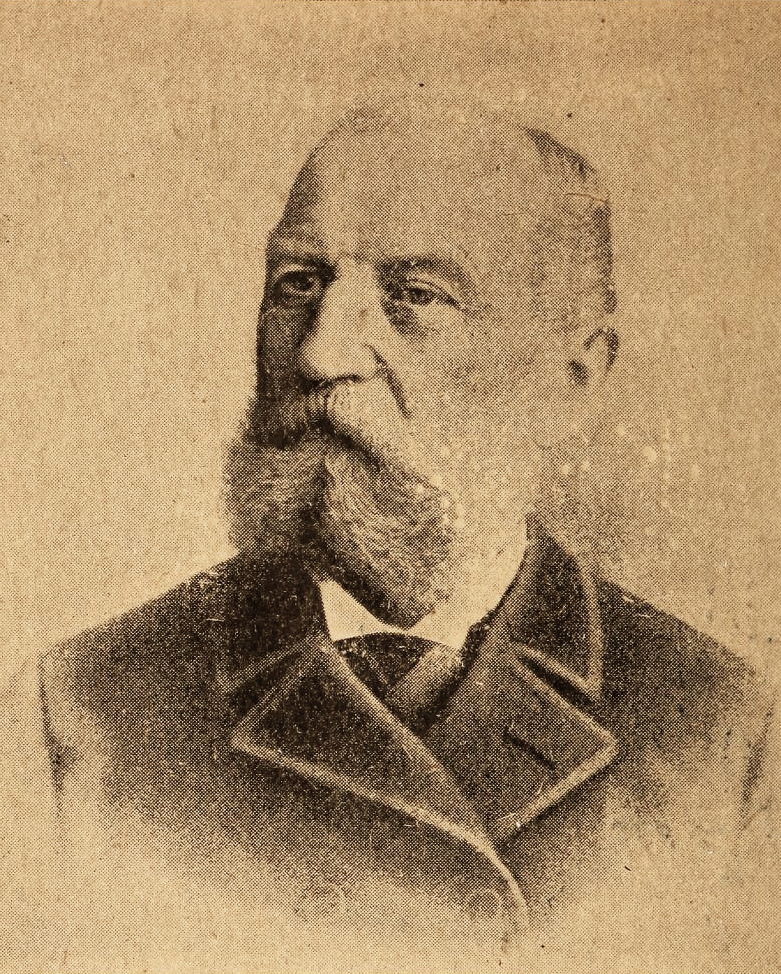
Captain George T. Balch wrote an early pledge of allegiance.

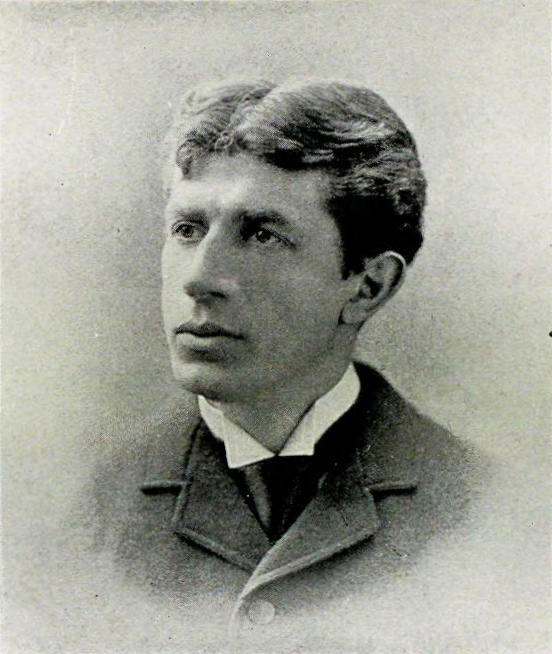
Reverend Francis Bellamy wrote the version that became official.

An early pledge was created in 1887 by Captain George T. Balch, a veteran of the Civil War, who later became auditor of the New York Board of Education. Balch's pledge, which was recited contemporaneously with Bellamy's until the 1923 National Flag Conference, read:

We give our heads and hearts to God and our country; one country, one language, one flag!

Balch was a proponent of teaching children, especially those of immigrants, loyalty to the United States, even going so far as to write a book on the subject and work with both the government and private organizations to distribute flags to every classroom and school. Balch's pledge, which predates Francis Bellamy's by five years and was embraced by many schools, by the Daughters of the American Revolution until the 1910s, and by the Grand Army of the Republic until the 1923 National Flag Conference, is often overlooked when discussing the history of the Pledge.

=== Bellamy pledge ===
The pledge that later evolved into the form used today was composed in August 1892 by Francis Bellamy (1855–1931) for the popular children's magazine The Youth's Companion. Francis Bellamy, who was a Baptist minister, a Christian socialist, and the cousin of Edward Bellamy (1850–1898), described the text of Balch's pledge as "too juvenile and lacking in dignity." The Bellamy "Pledge of Allegiance" was first published in the September 8, 1892, issue of The Youth's Companion as part of the National Public-School Celebration of Columbus Day, a celebration of the 400th anniversary of Christopher Columbus's arrival in the Americas. The event was conceived and promoted by James B. Upham, a marketer for the magazine, as a campaign to instill the idea of American nationalism in students and to encourage children to raise flags above their schools. According to author Margarette S. Miller, this campaign was in line both with Upham's patriotic vision as well as with his commercial interest. According to Miller, Upham "would often say to his wife: 'Mary, if I can instill into the minds of our American youth a love for their country and the principles on which it was founded, and create in them an ambition to carry on with the ideals which the early founders wrote into The Constitution, I shall not have lived in vain.'" In 1957, Kenneth Keating instigated a report by Congress' Legislative Research Service that it was Francis Bellamy, and not James B. Upham, who wrote the September 8, 1892, article; Keating represented New York's 38th congressional district, which included Bellamy's birthplace, Mount Morris.

Bellamy's original Pledge:

I pledge allegiance to my Flag and the Republic for which it stands, one nation, indivisible, with liberty and justice for all.

The Pledge was supposed to be quick and to the point. Bellamy designed it to be recited in 15 seconds. As a socialist, he had initially also considered using the words equality and fraternity but decided against it.

Francis Bellamy and Upham had lined up the National Education Association to support the Youth's Companion as a sponsor of the Columbus Day observance and the use in that observance of the American flag. By June 29, 1892, Bellamy and Upham had arranged for Congress and President Benjamin Harrison to announce a proclamation making the public school flag ceremony the center of the Columbus Day celebrations. This arrangement was formalized when Harrison issued Presidential Proclamation 335. Subsequently, the Pledge was first used in public schools on October 12, 1892, during Columbus Day observances organized to coincide with the opening of the World's Columbian Exposition (the Chicago World's Fair), Illinois.

=== Francis Bellamy's account ===
In his recollection of the creation of the Pledge, Francis Bellamy said, "At the beginning of the nineties patriotism and national feeling was [sic] at a low ebb. The patriotic ardor of the Civil War was an old story ... The time was ripe for a reawakening of simple Americanism and the leaders in the new movement rightly felt that patriotic education should begin in the public schools." James Upham "felt that a flag should be on every schoolhouse," so his publication "fostered a plan of selling flags to schools through the children themselves at cost, which was so successful that 25,000 schools acquired flags in the first year (1892–93).

As the World's Columbian Exposition was set to celebrate the 400th anniversary of the arrival of Christopher Columbus in the Americas, Upham sought to link the publication's flag drive to the event, "so that every school in the land ... would have a flag raising, under the most impressive conditions." Bellamy was placed in charge of this operation and was soon lobbying "not only the superintendents of education in all the States, but [he] also worked with governors, Congressmen, and even the President of the United States." The publication's efforts paid off when Benjamin Harrison declared Wednesday, October 12, 1892, to be Columbus Day for which The Youth's Companion made "an official program for universal use in all the schools." Bellamy recalled that the event "had to be more than a list of exercises. The ritual must be prepared with simplicity and dignity."

Edna Dean Proctor wrote an ode for the event: "There was also an oration suitable for declamation." Bellamy held that "Of course, the nub of the program was to be the raising of the flag, with a salute to the flag recited by the pupils in unison." He found "There was not a satisfactory enough form for this salute. The Balch salute, which ran, "I give my heart and my hand to my country, one country, one language, one flag," seemed to him too juvenile and lacking in dignity." After working on the idea with Upham, Bellamy concluded, "It was my thought that a vow of loyalty or allegiance to the flag should be the dominant idea. I especially stressed the word 'allegiance'. ... Beginning with the new word allegiance, I first decided that 'pledge' was a better school word than 'vow' or 'swear'; and that the first person singular should be used, and that 'my' flag was preferable to 'the.'" Bellamy considered the words "country, nation, or Republic," choosing the last as "it distinguished the form of government chosen by the founding fathers and established by the Revolution. The true reason for allegiance to the flag is the Republic for which it stands." Bellamy then reflected on the sayings of Revolutionary and Civil War figures, and concluded, "All that pictured struggle reduced itself to three words, one Nation indivisible."

Bellamy considered the slogan of the French Revolution, Liberté, égalité, fraternité ("liberty, equality, fraternity"), but held that "fraternity was too remote of realization, and … [that] equality was a dubious word." Concluding "Liberty and justice were surely basic, were undebatable, and were all that any one Nation could handle if they were exercised for all. They involved the spirit of equality and fraternity."

After being reviewed by Upham and other members of The Youth's Companion, the Pledge was approved and put in the official Columbus Day program. Bellamy noted that "in later years the words 'to my flag' were changed to 'to the flag of the United States of America' because of the large number of foreign children in the schools." Bellamy disliked the change, as "it did injure the rhythmic balance of the original composition."

=== Contested authorship of the pledge ===
An alternative theory is that the pledge was submitted to an 1890 patriotic competition in The Youth's Companion by a 13-year-old Kansas schoolboy, coincidentally named Frank E. Bellamy. A May 1892 newspaper from Hays, Kansas reported on an April 30 school flag-raising that was accompanied by an almost identical pledge. This ceremony would have taken place months before Francis supposedly created the pledge during August of that same year, according to his own testimony. The discovery was made by the noted amateur lexicographer Barry Popik, who collaborated with Fred Shapiro, an associate library director at the Yale School of Law. Shapiro previously attributed the pledge to Francis Bellamy in The Yale Book of Quotations, which he edits, but now regards Popik's discovery as favoring Frank E. Bellamy rather than Francis Bellamy as the originator and intends to update future versions of the book to reflect this.

== Changes ==
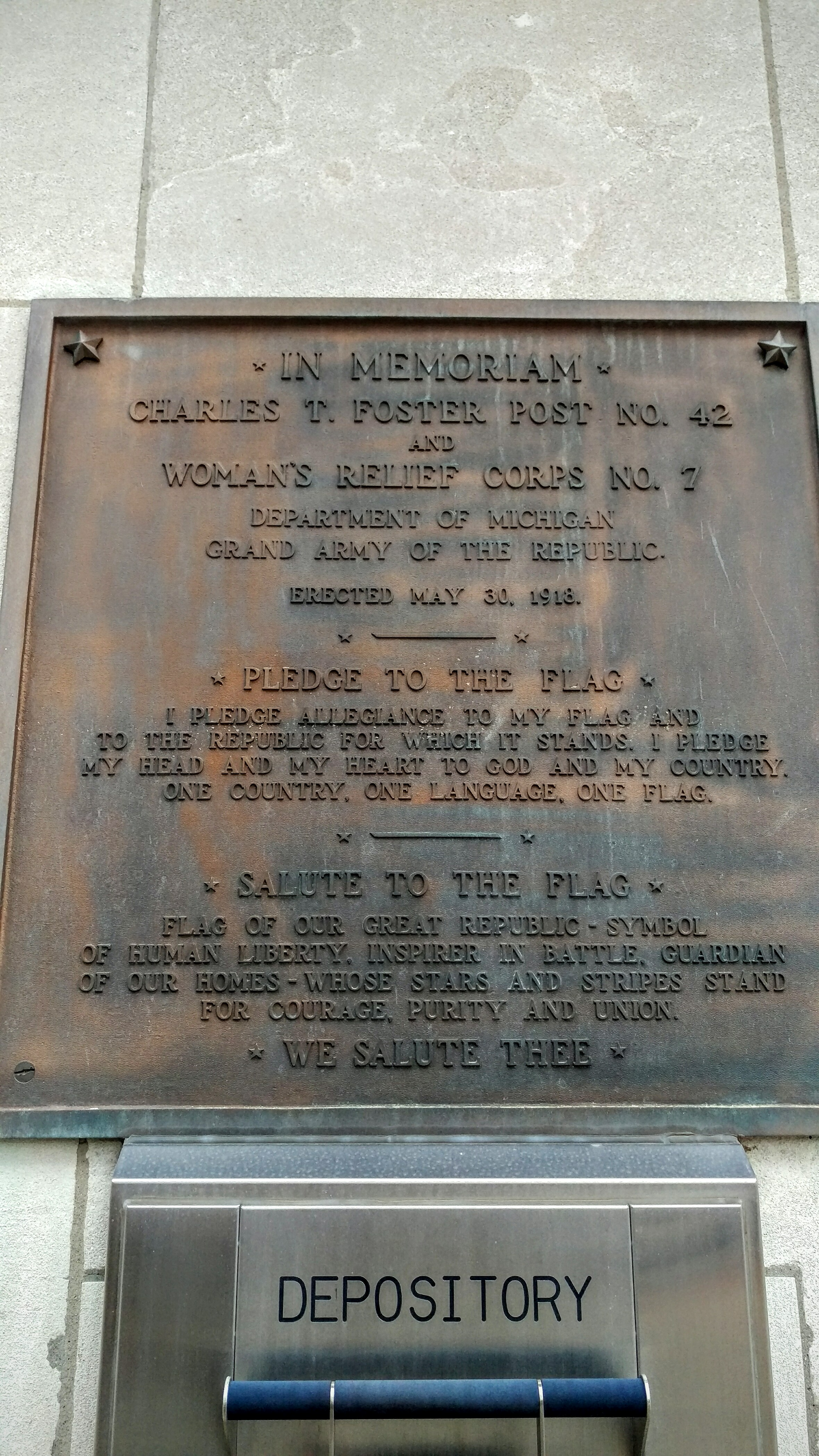
A plaque in Lansing, Michigan, dated 1918, listing the Balch Pledge, which was used parallel to the Bellamy Pledge until the National Flag Conference in 1923

In 1906, The Daughters of the American Revolution's magazine, The American Monthly, used the following wording for the pledge of allegiance, based on Balch's Pledge:

I pledge allegiance to my flag, and the republic for which it stands. I pledge my head and my heart to God and my country. One country, one language and one flag.

In subsequent publications of the Daughters of the American Revolution, such as in 1915's "Proceedings of the Twenty-Fourth Continental Congress of the Daughters of the American Revolution" and 1916's annual "National Report," the previous pledge (adjusted to read "I pledge my head, my hand, my heart..."), listed as official in 1906, is now categorized as "Old Pledge" with Bellamy's version under the heading "New Pledge." The "Old Pledge" was still taken in other organizations until the National Flag Conference established uniform flag procedures in 1923.

In 1923, the National Flag Conference called for the words "my Flag" to be changed to "the Flag of the United States," so that foreign-born people would not confuse loyalties between their birth countries and the US. The words "of America" were added a year later. Congress officially recognized the Pledge for the first time, in the following form, on June 22, 1942:

I pledge allegiance to the flag of the United States of America, and to the Republic for which it stands, one Nation indivisible, with liberty and justice for all.

=== Addition of "under God" ===
Louis Albert Bowman, an attorney from Illinois, was the first to suggest the addition of "under God" to the pledge. The National Society of the Daughters of the American Revolution gave him an Award of Merit as the originator of this idea. He spent his adult life in the Chicago area and was chaplain of the Illinois Society of the Sons of the American Revolution. At a meeting on February 12, 1948, he led the society in reciting the pledge with the two words "under God" added. He said that the words came from Lincoln's Gettysburg Address. Although not all manuscript versions of the Gettysburg Address contain the words "under God," all the reporters' transcripts of the speech as delivered do, as perhaps Lincoln may have deviated from his prepared text and inserted the phrase when he said "that the nation shall, under God, have a new birth of freedom." Bowman repeated his revised version of the Pledge at other meetings.

During the Cold War era, many Americans wanted to distinguish the United States from the state atheism promoted by communist countries, a view that led to support for the words "under God" to be added to the Pledge of Allegiance.

In 1951, the Knights of Columbus, the world's largest Catholic fraternal service organization, also began including the words "under God" in the Pledge of Allegiance. In New York City, on April 30, 1951, the board of directors of the Knights of Columbus adopted a resolution to amend the text of their Pledge of Allegiance at the opening of each of the meetings of the 800 Fourth Degree Assemblies of the Knights of Columbus by addition of the words "under God" after the words "one nation." Over the next two years, the idea spread throughout Knights of Columbus organizations nationwide. On August 21, 1952, the Supreme Council of the Knights of Columbus at its annual meeting adopted a resolution urging that the change be made universal, and copies of this resolution were sent to the President, the Vice President (as Presiding Officer of the Senate), and the Speaker of the House of Representatives. The National Fraternal Congress meeting in Boston on September 24, 1952, adopted a similar resolution upon the recommendation of its president, Supreme Knight Luke E. Hart. Several State Fraternal Congresses acted likewise almost immediately thereafter. This campaign led to several official attempts to prompt Congress to adopt the Knights of Columbus policy for the entire nation. These attempts were eventually a success.

At the suggestion of a correspondent, Representative Louis C. Rabaut (D–MI), sponsored a resolution to add the words "under God" to the Pledge in 1953.

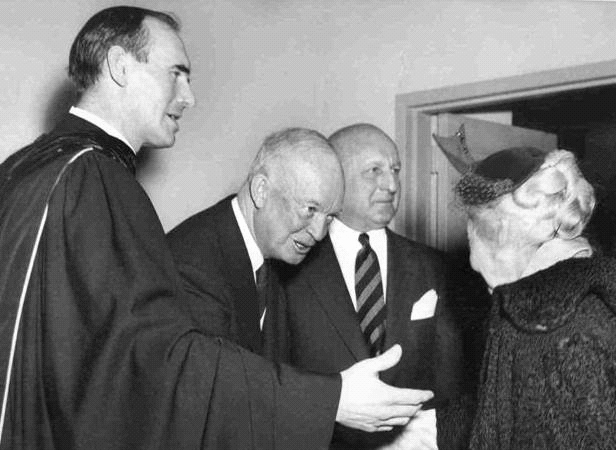
George MacPherson Docherty (left) and President Eisenhower (second from left) on the morning of February 7, 1954, at the New York Avenue Presbyterian Church

Before February 1954, no endeavor to get the pledge officially amended had succeeded. The final successful push came from George MacPherson Docherty. Some American presidents honored Lincoln's birthday by attending services at the church Lincoln attended, New York Avenue Presbyterian Church by sitting in Lincoln's pew on the Sunday nearest February 12. On February 7, 1954, with President Dwight D. Eisenhower sitting in Lincoln's pew, Docherty, the church's pastor, delivered a sermon based on the Gettysburg Address entitled "A New Birth of Freedom." He argued that the nation's might lay not in arms but rather in its spirit and higher purpose. He noted that the Pledge's sentiments could be those of any nation: "There was something missing in the pledge, and that which was missing was the characteristic and definitive factor in the American way of life." He cited Lincoln's words "under God" as defining words that set the US apart from other nations.

President Eisenhower had been baptized a Presbyterian very recently, just a year before. He responded enthusiastically to Docherty in a conversation following the service. Eisenhower acted on his suggestion the next day and on February 8, 1954, Rep. Charles Oakman (R–MI), introduced a bill to that effect. Congress passed the necessary legislation and Eisenhower signed the bill into law on Flag Day, June 14, 1954. Eisenhower said:

From this day forward, the millions of our school children will daily proclaim in every city and town, every village and rural school house, the dedication of our nation and our people to the Almighty.... In this way we are reaffirming the transcendence of religious faith in America's heritage and future; in this way we shall constantly strengthen those spiritual weapons which forever will be our country's most powerful resource, in peace or in war.

The phrase "under God" was incorporated into the Pledge of Allegiance on June 14, 1954, by a Joint Resolution of Congress amending § 4 of the Flag Code enacted in 1942.

On October 6, 1954, the National Executive Committee of the American Legion adopted a resolution, first approved by the Illinois American Legion Convention in August 1954, which formally recognized the Knights of Columbus for having initiated and brought forward the amendment to the Pledge of Allegiance.

== Salute ==
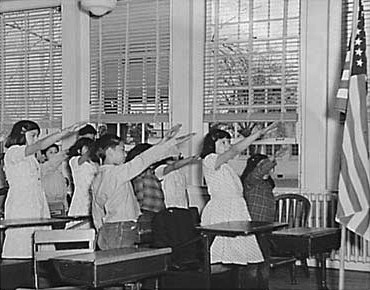
Children performing the Bellamy salute to the flag of the United States, 1941

Swearing of the Pledge is accompanied by a salute. An early version of the salute, adopted in 1887, accompanied the Balch pledge and was known as the Balch Salute. This salute instructed students to stand with their right hand outstretched toward the flag, the fingers of which are then brought to the forehead, followed by being placed flat over the heart, and finally falling to the side.

In 1892, Francis Bellamy created what was known as the Bellamy salute to accompany his own version of the Pledge of Allegiance. It started with the hand outstretched toward the flag, palm down, and ended with the palm up. Many decades later, during World War II, controversy arose because of the similarity between the Bellamy salute and the Nazi salute, which was adopted in Germany in the 1930s (although, unlike the Bellamy salute, this one did not end with the palm up). As a result, the US Congress stipulated that the hand-over-the-heart gesture would instead be rendered by civilians during the Pledge of Allegiance and the national anthem, thereby replacing the Bellamy salute. Removal of the Bellamy salute occurred on December 22, 1942, when Congress amended the Flag Code language first passed into law on June 22, 1942. Attached to bills passed in Congress in 2008 and then in 2009 (Section 301(b)(1) of title 36, United States Code), language was included which authorized all active duty military personnel and all veterans in civilian clothes to render a proper hand salute during the raising and lowering of the flag, when the colors are presented, and during the National Anthem.

Sarah Churchwell has argued that the term "salute", as it relates to the Bellamy and Balch salutes, historically referred to the words of the pledges themselves, not a physical gesture.

== Music ==
Musical setting by Irving Caesar

A musical setting for "The Pledge of Allegiance to the Flag" was created by Irving Caesar, at the suggestion of Congressman Louis C. Rabaut whose House Resolution 243 to add the phrase "under God" was signed into law on Flag Day, June 14, 1954.

The composer Irving Caesar wrote and published over 700 songs in his lifetime. Dedicated to social issues, he donated all rights of the musical setting to the U.S. government, so that anyone can perform the piece without owing royalties.

It was sung for the first time on the floor of the House of Representatives on Flag Day, June 14, 1955, by the official Air Force choral group the "Singing Sergeants". A July 29, 1955, House and Senate resolution authorized the U.S. Government Printing Office to print and distribute the song sheet together with a history of the pledge.

Other musical versions of the Pledge have since been copyrighted, including by Beck (2003), Lovrekovich (2002 and 2001), Roton (1991), Fijol (1986), and Girardet (1983).

== Controversy ==
In 1940, the Supreme Court, in Minersville School District v. Gobitis, ruled that students in public schools, including the respondents in that case—Jehovah's Witnesses who considered the flag salute to be idolatry—could be compelled to swear the Pledge. In 1943, in West Virginia State Board of Education v. Barnette, the Supreme Court reversed its decision. Justice Robert H. Jackson, writing for the 6 to 3 majority, went beyond simply ruling in the precise matter presented by the case to say that public school students are not required to say the Pledge on narrow grounds, and asserted that such ideological dogmata are antithetical to the principles of the country, concluding with:

If there is any fixed star in our constitutional constellation, it is that no official, high or petty, can prescribe what shall be orthodox in politics, nationalism, religion, or other matters of opinion or force citizens to confess by word or act their faith therein. If there are any circumstances which permit an exception, they do not now occur to us.

In 2004, the 11th Circuit Court of Appeals held that students are also not required to stand for the Pledge.

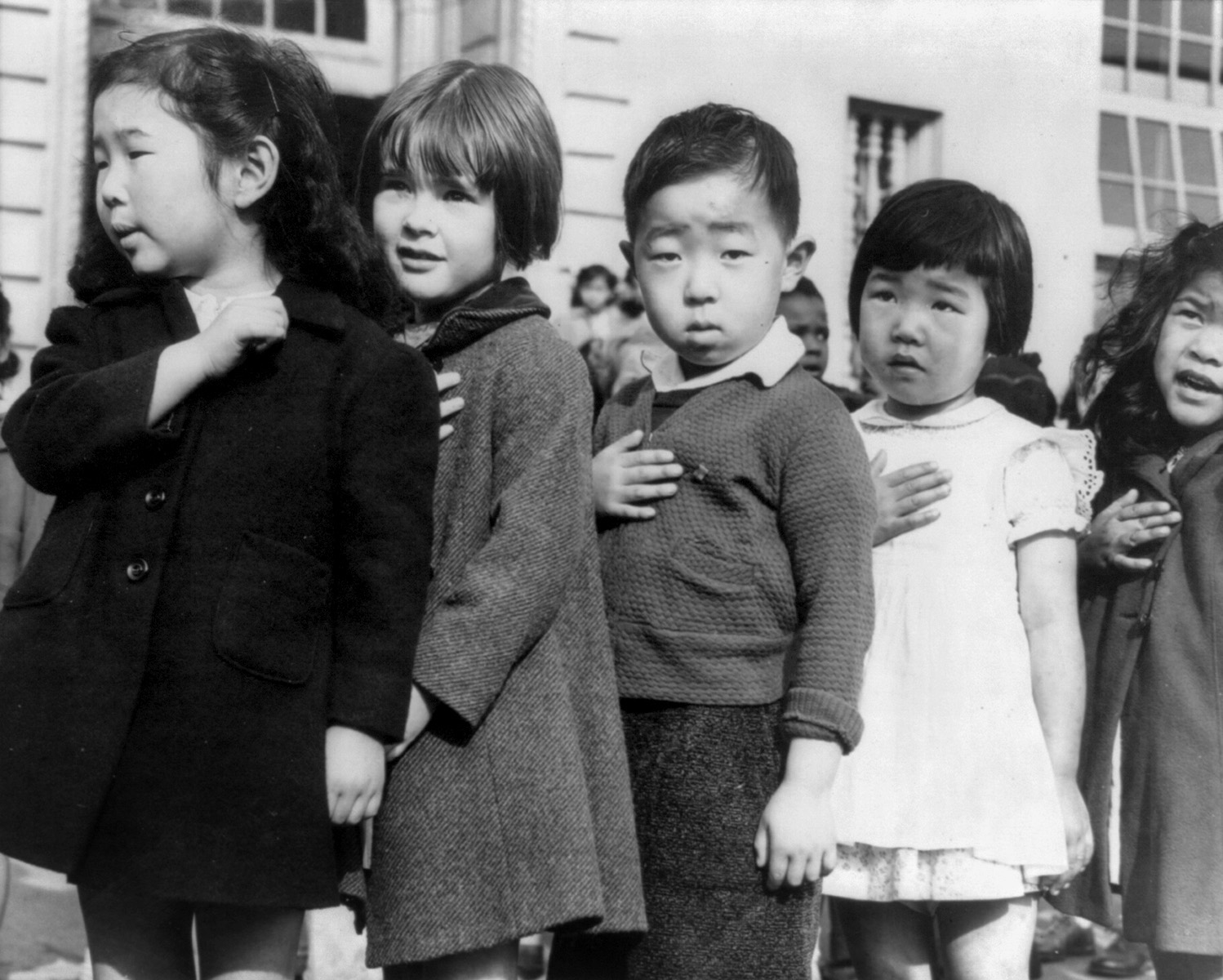
First graders of Japanese ancestry pledging allegiance to the American flag (1942, photo by Dorothea Lange)

Requiring or promoting of the Pledge on the part of the government has continued to draw criticism and legal challenges on several grounds.

One objection is that a constitutional republic built on freedom of dissent should not require its citizens to pledge allegiance to it, and that the First Amendment to the United States Constitution protects the right to refrain from speaking or standing, which itself is also a form of speech in the context of the ritual of pledging allegiance. Another objection is that the people who are most likely to recite the Pledge every day, small children in schools, cannot really give their consent or even completely understand the Pledge they are making. Another criticism is the belief that a government requiring or promoting the phrase "under God" violates protections against the establishment of religion guaranteed in the Establishment Clause of the First Amendment.

In 2004, linguist Geoffrey Nunberg said the original supporters of the addition thought that they were simply quoting Lincoln's Gettysburg Address, but to Lincoln and his contemporaries, "under God" meant "God willing", so they would have found its use in the Pledge of Allegiance grammatically incorrect and semantically odd.

In popular culture, the pledge has been mocked or altered by several movies and television series including, but not limited to, the Simpsons' inscription above the Springfield county courthouse's door of "Liberty and Justice for Most", first appearing in the twelfth episode of the first season in 1990.

=== Legal challenges ===
Prominent legal challenges were brought in the 1930s and 1940s by Jehovah's Witnesses, a denomination whose beliefs preclude swearing loyalty to any power other than God, and who objected to policies in public schools requiring students to swear an oath to the flag. They said requiring the pledge violated their freedom of religion guaranteed by the Free Exercise Clause of the First Amendment. The first case was in 1935, when two children, Lillian and William Gobitis, ages ten and twelve, were expelled from the Minersville, Pennsylvania, public schools that year for failing to salute the flag and recite the Pledge of Allegiance. The issue was finally settled in favor of the Witnesses by the 1943 Supreme Court ruling, West Virginia State Board of Education v. Barnette.

In a 2002 case brought by atheist Michael Newdow, whose daughter was being taught the Pledge in school, the Ninth Circuit Court of Appeals ruled the phrase "under God" an unconstitutional endorsement of monotheism when the Pledge was promoted in public school. In 2004, the Supreme Court heard Elk Grove Unified School District v. Newdow, an appeal of the ruling, and rejected Newdow's claim on the grounds that he was not the custodial parent, and therefore lacked standing, thus avoiding ruling on the merits of whether the phrase was constitutional in a school-sponsored recitation. On January 3, 2005, a new suit was filed in the U.S. District Court for the Eastern District of California on behalf of three unnamed families. On September 14, 2005, District Court Judge Lawrence Karlton ruled in their favor. Citing the precedent of the 2002 ruling by the Ninth Circuit Court of Appeals, Judge Karlton issued an order stating that, upon proper motion, he would enjoin the school district defendants from continuing their practices of leading children in pledging allegiance to "one Nation under God."

In 2006, in the Florida case Frazier v. Alexandre, a federal district court in Florida ruled that a 1943 state law requiring students to stand and recite the Pledge of Allegiance violates the First and Fourteenth Amendments of the U.S. Constitution. As a result of that decision, a Florida school district was ordered to pay $32,500 to a student who chose not to say the pledge and was ridiculed and called "unpatriotic" by a teacher.

In 2009, a Montgomery County, Maryland, teacher berated and had school police remove a 13-year-old girl who refused to say the Pledge of Allegiance in the classroom. The student's mother, assisted by the American Civil Liberties Union of Maryland, sought an apology from the teacher, as state law and the school's student handbook both prohibited students from being forced to recite the Pledge, and a spokesman for the school said that the teacher would have to do so.

On March 11, 2010, the Ninth Circuit Court of Appeals upheld the words "under God" in the Pledge of Allegiance in the case of Newdow v. Rio Linda Union School District. In a 2–1 decision, the appellate court ruled that the words were of a "ceremonial and patriotic nature" and did not constitute an establishment of religion. Judge Stephen Reinhardt dissented, writing that "the state-directed, teacher-led daily recitation in public schools of the amended 'under God' version of the Pledge of Allegiance... violates the Establishment Clause of the Constitution."

On November 12, 2010, in a unanimous decision, the United States Court of Appeals for the First Circuit in Boston affirmed a ruling by a New Hampshire lower federal court which found that the pledge's reference to God does not violate non-pledging students' rights if student participation in the pledge is voluntary. A United States Supreme Court appeal of this decision was denied on June 13, 2011.

In September 2013, a case was brought before the Massachusetts Supreme Judicial Court, arguing that the pledge violates the Equal Rights Amendment of the Constitution of Massachusetts. In May 2014, Massachusetts' highest court ruled that the pledge does not discriminate against atheists, saying that the words "under God" represent a patriotic, not a religious, exercise.

In February 2015 New Jersey Superior Court Judge David F. Bauman dismissed a lawsuit, ruling that "… the Pledge of Allegiance does not violate the rights of those who don't believe in God and does not have to be removed from the patriotic message." The case against the Matawan-Aberdeen Regional School District had been brought by a student of the district and the American Humanist Association that argued that the phrase "under God" in the pledge created a climate of discrimination because it promoted religion, making non-believers "second-class citizens." In a 21-page decision, Bauman wrote, "Under [the association members'] reasoning, the very constitution under which [the members] seek redress for perceived atheistic marginalization could itself be deemed unconstitutional, an absurd proposition which [association members] do not and cannot advance here." Bauman said the student could skip the pledge, but upheld a New Jersey law that says pupils must recite the pledge unless they have "conscientious scruples" that do not allow it. He noted, "As a matter of historical tradition, the words 'under God' can no more be expunged from the national consciousness than the words 'In God We Trust' from every coin in the land, than the words 'so help me God' from every presidential oath since 1789, or than the prayer that has opened every congressional session of legislative business since 1787."

== See also ==
- Accommodationism and separation of church and state, which provide more information surrounding "under God" in the pledge
- Australian citizenship affirmation, a similar pledge for adults becoming Australian citizens.
- Ceremonial deism
- The Children's Story, a fictional analysis of what the pledge and flag mean for children taught to recite
- In God We Trust, national motto of the United States
- Loyalty oath
- Loyalty oaths in the United States
  - Oath of Allegiance (United States)
- Youth's Companion Building, where the Pledge of Allegiance was written and published
