= Michael Newdow =

American attorney and emergency medicine physician

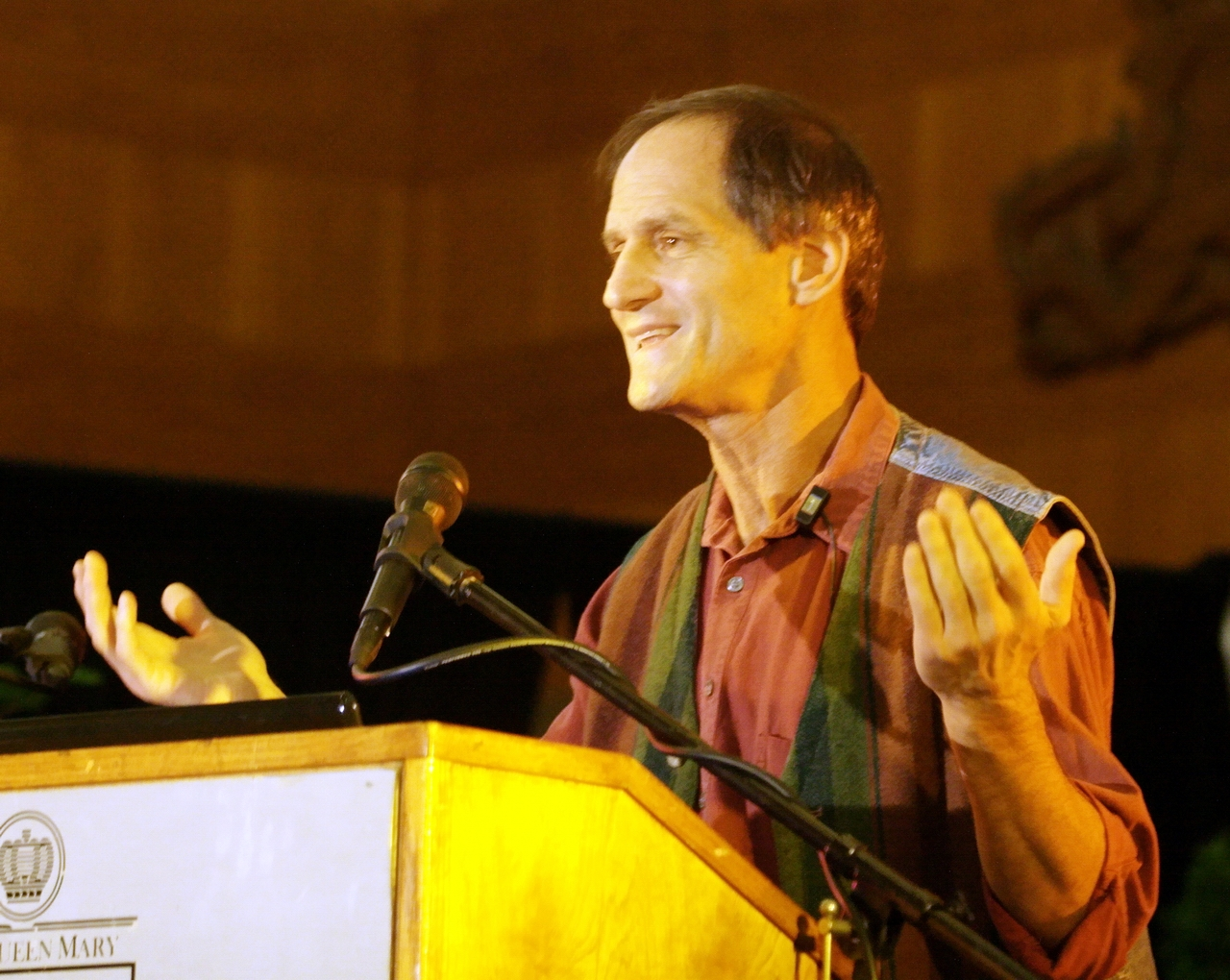
- Speaking at the Atheist Alliance International Convention, 2008
- Born: Michael Arthur Newdow; June 24, 1953 (age 73); New York City, New York
- Education: Brown University (BS); UCLA (MD); University of Michigan (JD)
- Occupations: Attorney, physician, activist, ordained atheist minister at Universal Life Church

Michael Arthur Newdow (born June 24, 1953) is an American attorney and emergency medicine physician. He is best known for his efforts to have recitations of the current version of the Pledge of Allegiance in public schools in the United States declared unconstitutional because of its inclusion of the phrase "under God". He also filed and lost a lawsuit to stop the invocation prayer at President Bush's second inauguration and in 2009 he filed a lawsuit to prevent references to God and religion from being part of President Obama's inauguration.

Newdow is an atheist and an ordained minister of the Universal Life Church. In 1997, he started an organization called FACTS (First Atheist Church of True Science), which advocates strong separation of church and state in public institutions. He also serves on the Advisory Board of Secular Coalition for America.

== Early life and education ==
Newdow grew up in the Bronx and in Teaneck, New Jersey, where his nominally Jewish family moved in 1960. He graduated from Teaneck High School.

After graduating from high school, Newdow attended Brown University, where he received a Bachelor of Science degree in biology in 1974. He told Brown Alumni Magazine that he can't remember ever believing in God, saying, "I was born an atheist."

He then attended the UCLA School of Medicine, earning his M.D. in 1978. He has worked as an emergency room physician at numerous hospitals, and holds medical licenses in California and several other states.

Newdow attended the University of Michigan Law School, graduating with a J.D. in 1988. He subsequently passed the bar exam in Sacramento County, California (District 3) and was admitted to the State Bar of California on July 29, 2002; he is still an active member there, as of August, 2018.

== Litigation ==
=== Pledge of Allegiance ===
Newdow is best known for the lawsuit which he states was filed on behalf of his daughter against inclusion of the words "under God" in public schools' recitals of the United States' Pledge of Allegiance. The United States Court of Appeals for the Ninth Circuit found that the phrase constitutes an endorsement of religion, and therefore violates the Establishment Clause of the First Amendment to the United States Constitution. However, the decision was later overruled by the Supreme Court of the United States on procedural grounds, citing that Newdow did not have custody of his daughter and therefore did not have the right to bring suit on her behalf, nor did he meet the Court's prudential standing requirements to bring the suit on behalf of himself.

Newdow filed suit again in the United States District Court for the Eastern District of California regarding the same issue, but this time on behalf of three unnamed parents and their children. Citing the precedent set by the Supreme Court in the course of Newdow's previous suit, Judge Lawrence K. Karlton ruled that Newdow did not have standing to bring his lawsuit, but the other plaintiffs did have standing. Based on the previous ruling by the Ninth Circuit, the judge ruled that the pledge is unconstitutional when recited in public schools.

On March 11, 2010, the United States Court of Appeals for the Ninth Circuit upheld the words "under God" in the Pledge of Allegiance in the case of Newdow v. Rio Linda Union School District. On page 60 of the ruling the court writes: "We hold that the California Education Code - 52720 and the School District's policy having teachers lead students in the recitation of the Pledge, and having those who do not wish to participate do so with impunity, do not violate the Establishment Clause. Therefore we reverse the decision of the district court holding that the School District's policy is unconstitutional and vacate the permanent injunction prohibiting the recitation of the Pledge by willing students." The court also ruled against Newdow in that he had no prudential standing to file a complaint in the first place. Senior Circuit Judge Dorothy W. Nelson joined Judge Carlos T. Bea in the ruling, but Judge Stephen Reinhardt dissented.

=== In God We Trust ===
In November 2005, Newdow announced that he wanted to have "In God We Trust" removed from U.S. coins and banknotes. In a November 14, 2005 interview with Fox News's Neil Cavuto, Newdow compared "In God We Trust" appearing on United States currency with racial segregation (specifically separate drinking fountains), saying, "How can you not compare those? What is the difference there? Both of them [whites and blacks] got equal water. They both had access. It was government saying that it's okay to separate out these two people on the basis of race. Here we're saying it's okay to separate two people on the basis of their religious beliefs."

In a 2006 interview on the day that the United States House of Representatives passed the Pledge Protection Act, Newdow told WERS-FM's David Goodman, "A few hours ago, the House of Representatives of the Congress of the United States of America voted 260 to 167 to completely gut the U.S. Constitution of its separation of powers and violate numerous other clauses because they thought it was important enough to keep 'under God' in the Pledge of Allegiance. I don't think people would've done that for our political heritage or anything else. They did it because they want God in their government because it stands for a religious view that they adhere to, and they want to see that religious view espoused by government, which is exactly what the Establishment Clause forbids."

In June 2006, a federal judge rejected Newdow's Establishment Clause lawsuit on the grounds that the minted words amount to a secular national slogan, and do not dictate anyone's beliefs. Newdow stated that he would appeal the ruling, although Aronow v. United States was decided on the same grounds in the United States Court of Appeals for the Ninth Circuit and the lower court was required to return the same ruling, likewise the Ninth Circuit does not traditionally overrule previous Ninth Circuit rulings.

On December 4, 2007, Newdow argued before a three-judge panel of the Ninth Circuit to remove both "under God" from the Pledge of Allegiance (Roe v. Rio Linda Union School District), and "In God We Trust" from United States currency. The Ninth Circuit rejected Newdow's challenge. In a decision published March 11, 2010, the court held that its earlier decision in Aronow, which "held the national motto is of a "patriotic or ceremonial character," has no "theological or ritualistic impact," and does not constitute "governmental sponsorship of a religious exercise," foreclosed Newdow's argument. In an opinion concurring only in the judgment, even the extremely liberal Judge Stephen Reinhardt agreed that Aronow was controlling precedent.

Newdow also filed a lawsuit in federal court after Franklin Graham gave the invocation at George W. Bush's 2001 inauguration. The lawsuit claimed that inaugural prayer was an unconstitutional endorsement of religion. It also was unsuccessful.

In 2019, Newdow once again failed to win yet another lawsuit, this time against the phrase "In God We Trust" on U.S. currency. The U.S. Supreme Court outright rejected the case, stating that the phrase "does not compel citizens to engage in religion."

=== California textbook case ===
Newdow also represents California Parents for the Equalization of Educational Materials (CAPEEM), a group that has filed a lawsuit against the officials of California Department of Education and the California State Board of Education. The lawsuit challenges the teaching of biblical events as historical facts and was brought by CAPEEM, which was formed by Hindu parents in California. CAPEEM eventually settled the lawsuit for $175,000.

=== Obama inauguration ===
Chief Justice John Roberts prompting Obama's "So Help Me God" with a question, "So Help You God" to differentiate from the other 36 constitutional words

On December 31, 2008, Newdow and 17 other people, plus 10 groups representing atheists, sued Chief Justice John G. Roberts and others involved in the inauguration of Barack Obama in the United States District Court for the District of Columbia, seeking to prevent the Chief Justice from saying "so help me God." The Constitution specifically defines only this single oath of office of 35 words and does not include these four words.

The Associated Press ran several reports including one picked up by The Washington Post and many other affiliates that inaccurately stated that the suit was an attempt by atheists to prevent the President from saying "so help me God." The suits specifically state that an injunction is not sought against the president, but rather only against the Chief Justice.

In addition, in other courts the demand was to end all religious prayer at the inauguration based on the establishment clause of the First Amendment, which he had sued to prevent in the two previous inaugurations unsuccessfully.

Judge Reggie Walton refused to grant Newdow's motion for a preliminary injunction, saying that as a district court judge, he did not feel he had the authority to issue such an order against the Chief Justice of the United States Supreme Court, and that the inclusion of such words is an exercise of the incoming President's right of free speech; although the president's right to express his private prayer in words of his choosing was specifically not challenged in the lawsuit, Chief Justice Roberts was served with a demand notice. The outcome was that Mr. Obama did conclude with "So Help Me God" but the prompting was in the form of a query, indicating that this was his choice and not part of the constitutionally prescribed oath of office.

Newdow later reported that he would not challenge the denial of his preliminary injunction motion, but would appeal the case through the appellate court. In Newdow v. Roberts, the D.C. Circuit Court of Appeals dismissed the case, holding that Newdow's claims with respect to the 2009 inauguration were moot, and that he lacked standing to challenge the 2013 and 2017 inaugurations. In May 2011, the United States Supreme Court denied Newdow's request to hear the case. Justice Roberts' response to Newdow's petition was to prompt Obama's "So Help Me God" with a question, "So Help You God?" to differentiate from the other 36 constitutional words.

== Awards ==
In November 2002, Newdow was given the Freethinker of the Year award by the Freedom From Religion Foundation following the Pledge case. In 2004, he received the special Recognition Freethought Hero Award for his case to remove "In God We Trust" from currency. In May 2004, the American Humanist Association gave Newdow its Humanist Pioneer Award.

== See also ==
- List of atheists
