= Coat of arms of New Westminster =

Heraldic emblem of the city

Arms of New Westminster

The arms of the City of New Westminster, in British Columbia, Canada, were adopted by city council in 1860, the year when the city was incorporated, and formally granted to the city by the Canadian Heraldic Authority in 1994.

== Symbols ==
Crest: A mural crown of silver and red, surmounted by a gold grizzly bear. The mural crown shows the status of New Westminster as a city, while the bear is a symbol of power.

Shield: A blue cross on a white field. The city's traditional industries are represented by the charges: a sailing ship for shipbuilding, a plowshare for agriculture, a fir tree for forestry, and two salmons for fishing.

Supporters: Two red lions, recalling the royal arms of Scotland. They each wear a medallion, one charged with a royal crown and the other with the symbol of the Hyack Anvil Battery.

Compartment: A forest mount and wavy ribbons on blue and silver, suggesting the city's setting on the Fraser River.

Scroll: The city motto, "In God We Trust" (shared with the national motto of the United States, among other things).
