= Seal of Florida =

Official government emblem of the U.S. state of Florida

Great Seal of the State of Florida
- Armiger: State of Florida
- Adopted: 1985
- Motto: In God We Trust

The Great Seal of the State of Florida is used to represent the government of the state of Florida, and for various official purposes, such as to seal official documents and legislation. It is commonly used on state government buildings, vehicles, and other effects of the state government. It also appears on the state flag of Florida. The University of Florida was granted the right to use the seal to represent the university.

The seal features a shoreline on which a Seminole woman is spreading flowers. Legend says that the woman is the historical heroine Milly Francis, but there is no documentation supporting this. Two Sabal palms (Florida's state tree) are growing. In the background, a steamboat sails before a sun breaks the horizon, with rays of sunlight extending into the sky. The seal is encircled with the words "Great Seal of the State of Florida", and "In God We Trust" (the state motto).

== History ==
Prior to the existence of the State of Florida and the Florida Territory, British East and West Florida had their own respective royal seals.

The Florida Legislature in 1868 specified in a joint resolution the design of Florida's first seal. "The Resolution specified that the seal had to be the size of an American silver dollar. It also stated that the seal should contain the sun's rays, a cocoa tree, a steamboat, and a female Indian scattering flowers. These images were to be circled by the words 'Great Seal of the State of Florida: In God We Trust.'"

Several changes have occurred on the seal over the years. The Indian woman no longer has a feathered headdress, which female Seminoles did not wear. "A mountain in the background has been flattened (Florida has no mountains). The steamboat has been revised a few times. And a sabal palm has been transplanted in place of the original cocoa tree to reflect the state's adoption of the Sabal palmetto palm as the official state tree in 1953. The latest revisions took place in 1985."

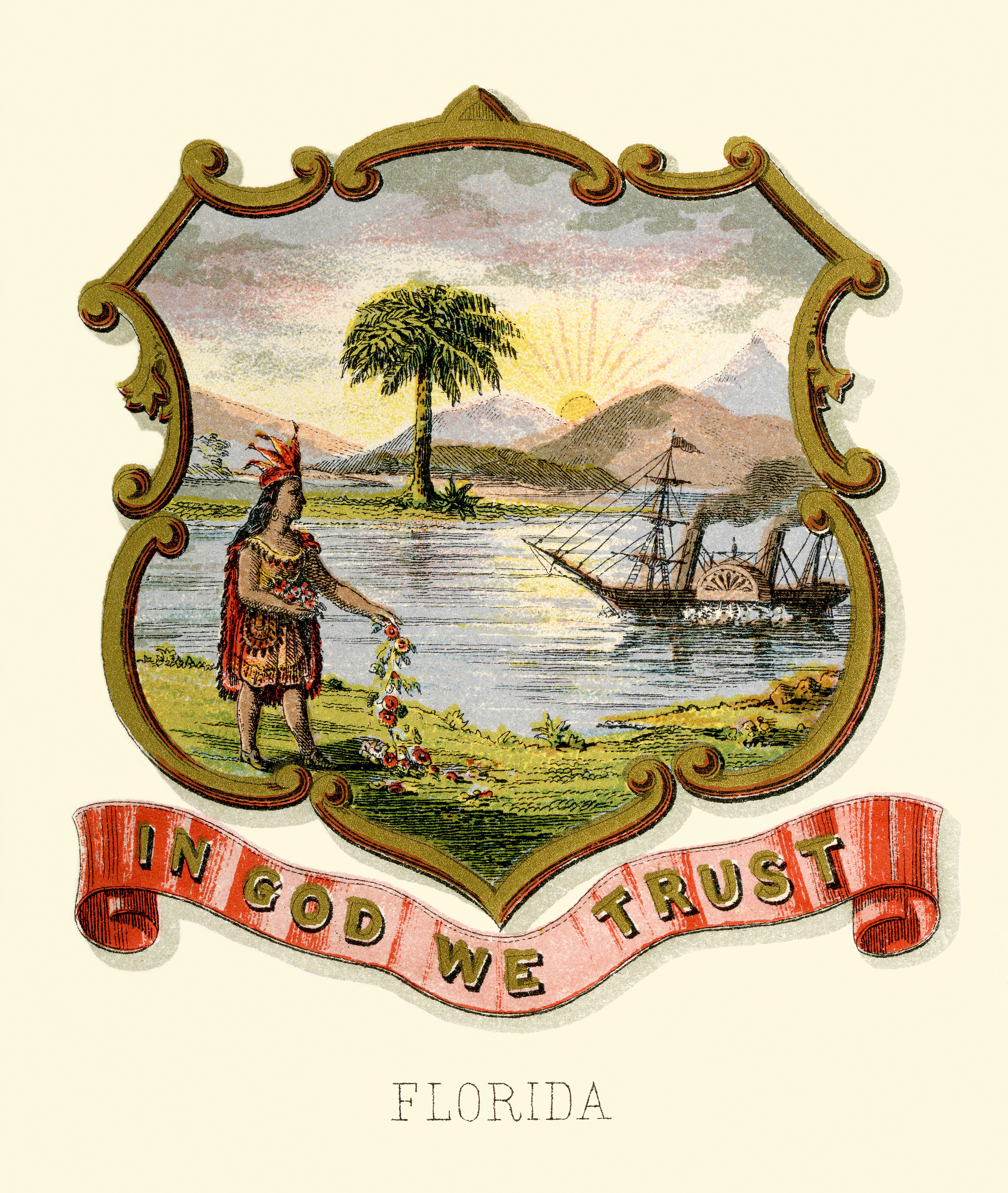
Historical coat of arms (1876)

Former seal of Florida used during the American Civil War, (1861–1868)

Former seal of Florida, used until 1985.

== Use of the seal ==
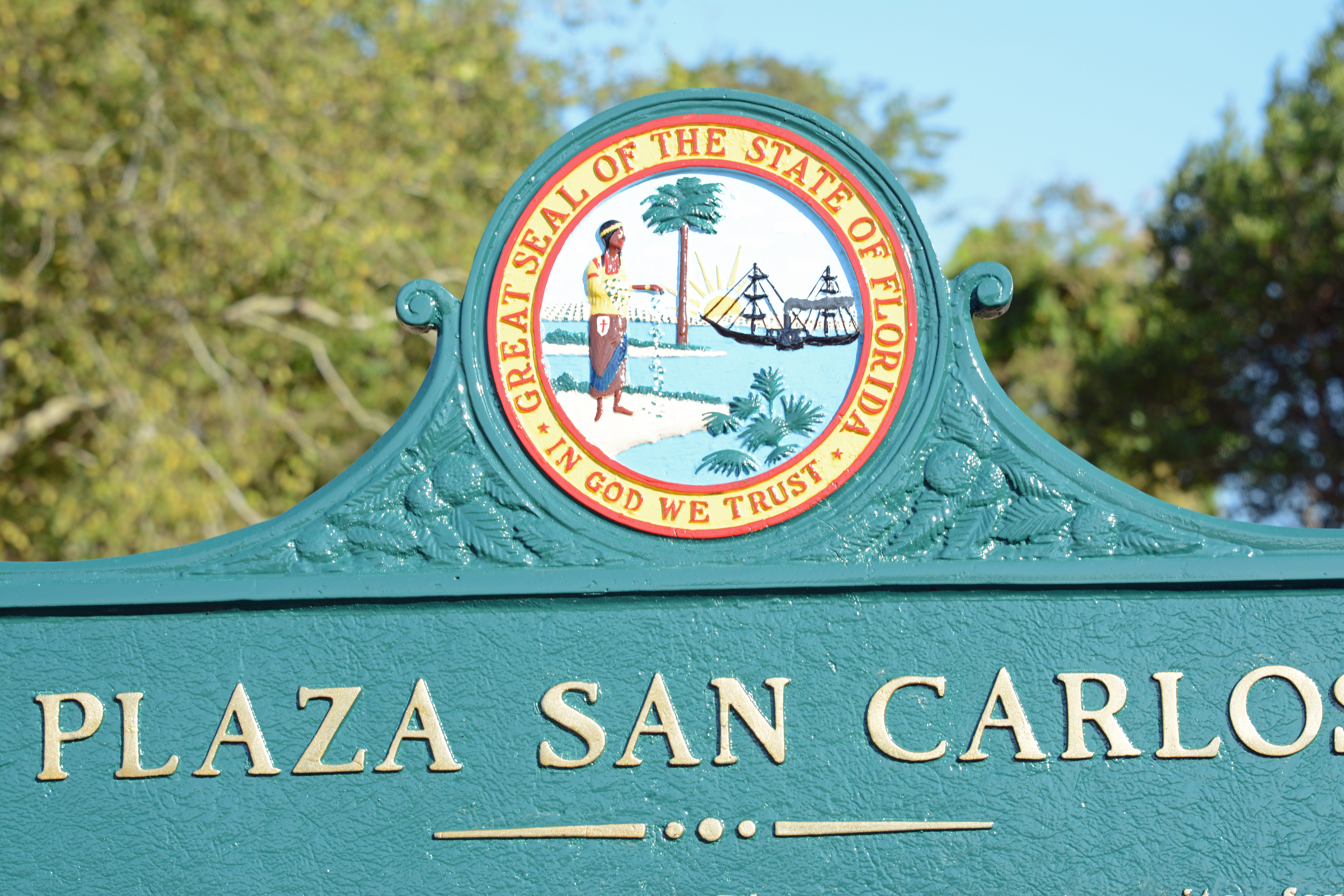
The seal on a historical marker (Fernandina)

The Florida Secretary of State is the official custodian of the seal. Use or display of the seal must be for an official purpose and approved by the Florida Department of State. One exception is that other Florida state or local agencies can use or display the seal for official business if approved by the head of their agency. Illegal use of the seal in Florida is a second-degree misdemeanor.

== Government seals of Florida ==
Seal of the Florida House of Representatives

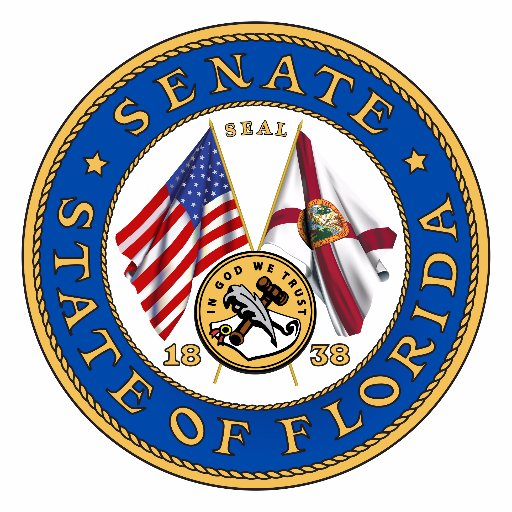
Seal of the Florida Senate

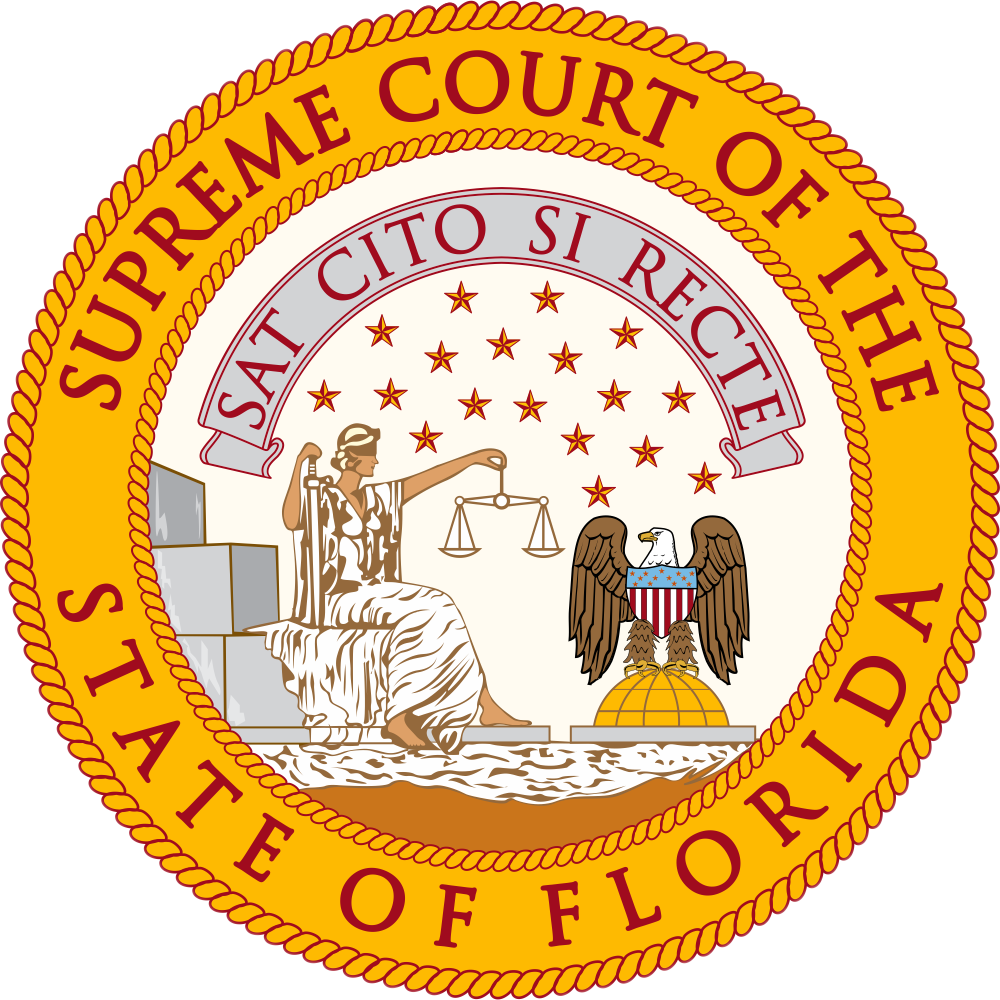
Seal of the Supreme Court of Florida

Seal of the Florida Department of Transportation

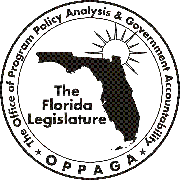
Seal of the Office of Program Policy Analysis and Government Accountability

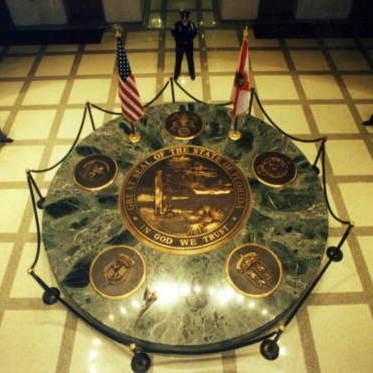
Security guards around the Great Seal of Florida - Tallahassee, Florida
