= Flag of Florida =

U.S. state flag

Florida
- Use: State flag
- Proportion: 2:3
- Adopted: November 6, 1900; 126 years ago (initial version); May 21, 1985; 41 years ago (standardization)
- Design: A red cross on a white field, with the state seal in the center.

The flag of Florida is the official flag of the U.S. state of Florida. The flag consists of a red saltire on a white background, with the state seal superimposed on the center. The current state flag was adopted on November 6, 1900, and has only been changed once on May 21, 1985 when the state seal was standardized.

It is one of three U.S. state flags to feature the words "In God We Trust" (the U.S. motto since 1956), with the other two being those of Georgia and Mississippi.

== Statute ==
The Florida state flag is defined by law as:

The seal of the state, in diameter one-half the hoist, shall occupy the center of a white ground. Red bars, in width one-fifth the hoist, shall extend from each corner toward the center, to the outer rim of the seal.

=== Design of the seal ===
Florida State Seal (1985–present), by John Locastro.

The state seal of Florida, as described in the 2024 Florida Statutes, Title IV, Chapter 15, § 15.03, contains:

- A view of the sun's rays over a distant highland
- A sabal palmetto palm tree in the foreground
- A steamboat on water
- A Native American female scattering flowers
- Encircling text reading "Great Seal of the State of Florida: In God We Trust"

The current rendition of the seal was adopted on May 21, 1985, by Governor Bob Graham and the Cabinet following a revision commissioned by Secretary of State George Firestone. The revision, executed by Museum of Florida History artist John Locastro, corrected inconsistencies that had persisted since 1868, including a misidentified cocoa palm, a Plains-style Indian maiden, unrealistic mountains, and a steamboat of questionable seaworthiness. Visually, the steamboat or steamship resembles side-wheel steamers of the 1800s, such as the Walk-in-the-Water (1818), the SS California (1848) or the CSS Oregon (1846).

== History ==
=== Colonial flags of Florida (1513–1821) ===
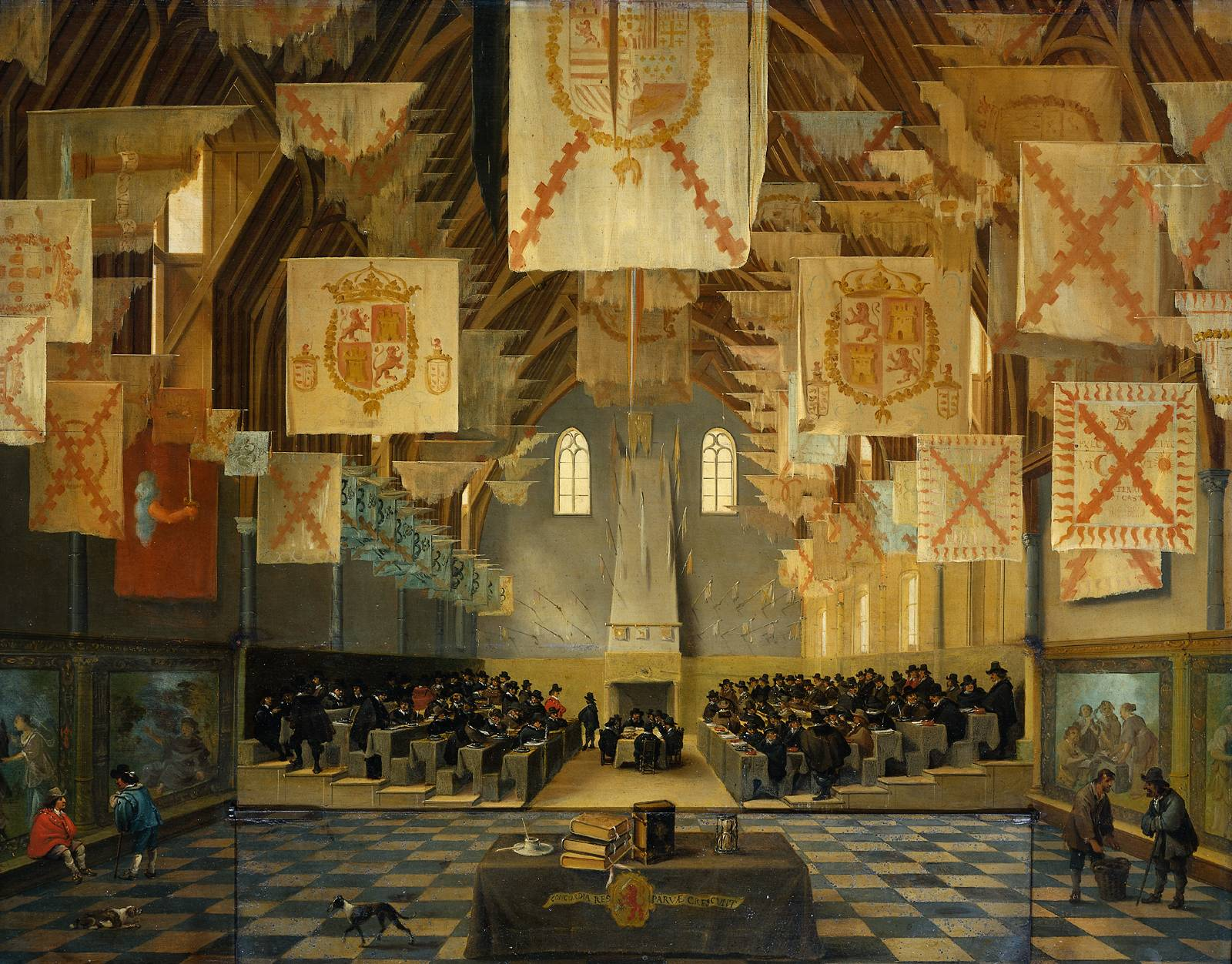
Painting of Burgundian saltires at the Great Assembly of the States-General in 1651.

Spain was a dynastic union and federation of kingdoms when Juan Ponce de León claimed Florida for the Spanish Crown on April 2, 1513. Colonial authorities used several banners or standards during the first period of settlement and governance in Florida, such as the royal standard of the Crown of Castile. As with other Spanish territories, the Burgundian saltire was generally used in Florida to represent collective Spanish sovereignty between 1565 and 1763. The red saltire of the Cross of Burgundy represents the cross on which St. Andrew was crucified, and the standard is frequently displayed today in Florida's historic Spanish settlements, such as St. Augustine.

In 1763, Spain passed control of Florida to Great Britain via the Treaty of Paris, following the latter's victory over France in the Seven Years' War, in exchange for other territory. Great Britain used the original union flag with the white diagonal stripes in Florida during this brief period. The British also divided the Florida territory into East Florida, with its capital at St. Augustine, and West Florida, with its capital at Pensacola. The border was the Apalachicola River.

Spain regained control of the Florida Provinces (las Floridas) in 1784 after the Siege of Pensacola and the Treaty of Paris following the American Revolutionary War, when Britain ceded its territories east of the Mississippi River. In 1784, King Charles III chose a new naval and battle flag for Spain, which had become a more centralized nation-state, and its crown territories. This tri-band of red-gold-red was used in the provinces of East and West Florida until they joined the United States in 1821. Florida was admitted to the Union in 1845.

=== The Chase Flag (1861) ===
Provisional flag of Florida, used January 13 – September 12, 1861.

In January 1861, Florida declared that it had seceded from the Union and declared itself a "sovereign and independent nation," reaffirming the Preamble in the Constitution of 1838. The state used the Naval Ensign of Texas as a provisional flag between January and September 1861, featuring red and white stripes with a blue canton with a white star It also used this flag when Floridian forces took control of U.S. forts and a Navy yard in Pensacola. Colonel William H. Chase was commander of Floridian troops, and the flag is also referred to as the Chase Flag.

=== Confederate-Era flag (1861–1868) ===
Flag of Florida as a member of the Confederacy, used September 13, 1861 – August 5, 1868.

Later that year, 1861, the Florida Legislature passed a law authorizing Governor Perry to design an official flag. His design was the tri-band of the Confederacy but with the blue field extending down and the new seal of Florida placed within the blue field.

As a member of the Confederacy, Florida saw use of all three versions of the Confederate flag. Beyond these, the Bonnie Blue flag (a single five-pointed star centered on a blue background, previously the flag of the short-lived Republic of West Florida) saw brief, unofficial use as a flag of the Confederacy in Florida.

=== Second flag (1868–1900) ===
Flag of Florida, August 6, 1868 – 1900.

Between 1868 and 1900, the flag of Florida was the state seal on a white background. In a discrepancy, however, a later version of the state seal depicts a steamboat with a white flag that includes a red saltire, similar to Florida's current flag. Although a flag with a similar design was used 1848 to represent the state.

=== Current Flag (1900–present) ===
Flag of Florida, November 6, 1900 – May 20, 1985.

In 1899, Senator Thomas Palmer introduced Senate Joint Resolution No. 221 to amend Article XVI, Section 12 of the 1885 Florida Constitution by adding red diagonal bars to the state flag. The resolution passed unanimously in the Senate on May 18 and in the House on May 31, and was published as Resolution No. 4 in the 1899 Laws of Florida. In the general election of November 6, 1900, Florida voters ratified the amendment by a vote of 5,088 to 3,819, thereby officially adopting the red-bar design. The provision remained part of the 1885 Constitution until the 1968 constitutional revision omitted it; the Legislature then reenacted the language without substantive change in 1970 as Section 15.012 of the Florida Statutes, where it remains the basis for the modern flag's design.

In 1908 the secretary of the state ordered a state custom state flag. It measured around 6 by 8 feet, with state seal being surround by gold leaf.

In 2001, a survey conducted by the North American Vexillological Association ranked Florida's state flag 34th in design quality of the 72 Canadian provincial, U.S. state and U.S. territorial flags ranked.

== Theories on origin ==
No one has provided definitive proof showing why Florida added the red bars to its state flag. The available evidence does not conclusively show whether the red bars were meant as a nod to Confederate symbolism, a reference to Florida's earlier Spanish history, a practical fix to avoid the flag looking like a white surrender flag, or some mix of these reasons.

When interpreting a modern Florida law with unclear wording, researchers typically consult the bill's staff analysis, a document explaining its purpose, history, and intent; however, because Florida did not preserve legislative documents created before 1969, no committee reports or other materials from the 1899 flag amendment survive, making the usual tools of legislative history unavailable for determining lawmakers' intent.

=== The "Surrender Flag" Problem ===
A 1965 University of Florida Press book recounts that the red bars added to Florida's flag in 1900 were suggested by the former Governor Francis P. Fleming, who believed the plain white field resembled a flag of truce when hanging limp. A story that traces back to a 1936 letter from attorney and former legislator John P. Stokes, who, after inquiring through Chief Justice J. B. Whitefield and Fleming's son, concluded that Fleming had both proposed the red bars and inspired the constitutional amendment. Stokes attributed Fleming's concern to his Confederate Army experience, where he would have seen the Confederacy's nearly all-white 1863 national flag appear like a surrender flag when still. A flaw that led the Confederacy to adopt a redesigned flag in 1865. Though no surviving personal papers definitively confirm Fleming's involvement.

=== Cross of Burgundy ===
It is considered likely that it was Fleming who proposed adding the red bars to Florida's flag. Fleming came from a prominent family whose roots in Florida dated to an 1816 Spanish land grant to his grandfather. A land grant issued under a Spanish regime whose troops flew the Cross of Burgundy, a symbol he likely knew.

=== Confederate Battle Flag ===
Some historians interpret the addition of a red saltire as a commemoration of Florida's contributions to the Confederacy by Governor Francis P. Fleming, who served in the 2nd Florida Regiment, Confederate army. The addition was made during a period promoting the "Lost Cause" of the antebellum South, around the time of the flag's change. According to historian John M. Coski, the Florida legislature adopted its new flag near the time when it disenfranchised African Americans and passed new Jim Crow laws and segregation. Other former Confederate slave states, such as Mississippi and Alabama, also adopted new state flags around the same time that they instituted segregation laws.

Not all historians agree with assertions about association with the Confederacy. James C. Clark, a lecturer in the University of Central Florida's history department, does not believe that Fleming's new flag had anything to do with the Confederacy. "That St. Andrew's Cross that Fleming added, the red cross, dates back to the original flag the Spanish flew over Florida in the 16th century." Similarly, Canter Brown Jr., a Florida state-educated historian who has written extensively on Florida history, says he has "seen no specific evidence linking this flag to the Confederate one."

=== Flag of Alabama ===
The flag of Alabama

Theories suggest that Florida may have borrowed the red-bar design for its flag from Alabama's state flag, adopted in 1895, which also features a red diagonal cross (the St. Andrew's Cross, or "saltire") on a white field, and one commentator has even directly proposed that Alabama's flag might have inspired Florida's 1900 design. Despite the similarity, an analysis by the University of Miami found no evidence that the Florida flag is derivative of the Alabama flag; no Florida newspapers reported on the adoption of Alabama's flag in 1895, and in the months leading up to the 1900 election in which the red saltire design was on the ballot in Florida, no newspaper mentioned the resemblance between the proposed design the flag of Alabama. Moreover, there is no surviving correspondence between Fleming and the designer of Alabama's flag, who might have been positioned to transmit the idea, although the two likely knew each other through Confederate veterans' organizations.

== Other flags ==
The Spanish Cross of Burgundy

The Green Cross of Florida flag flown over Amelia Island by the short-lived Republic of the Floridas in 1817

Flag used during the inauguration of Governor William Dunn Moseley in 1845.

Flag flown at the State Capitol on January 11, 1861, when Florida declared independence from the United States

The 1900 flag often had a square shape

== Flag of the governor ==
Florida does not currently have a flag that represents the governor. An unofficial governor's flag was used in 1968 by governor Claude Kirk on his limousine, which flew next to the state flag. It was described as a blue flag with a white eagle in the center, with the eagle being chosen to represent Kirk's self-appointed title, "The Eagle."

== Gallery ==
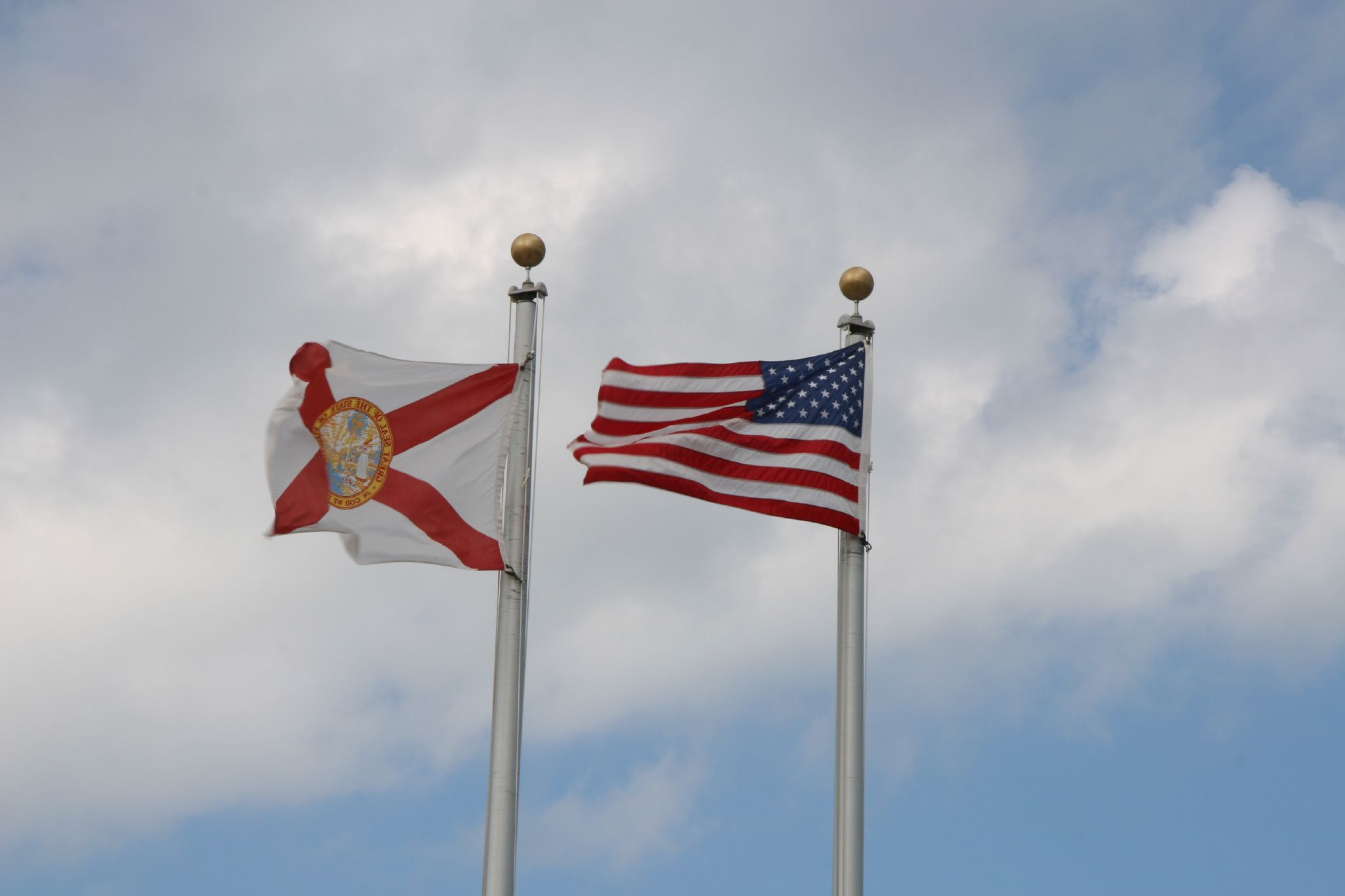
The Florida flag flying beside the United States flag

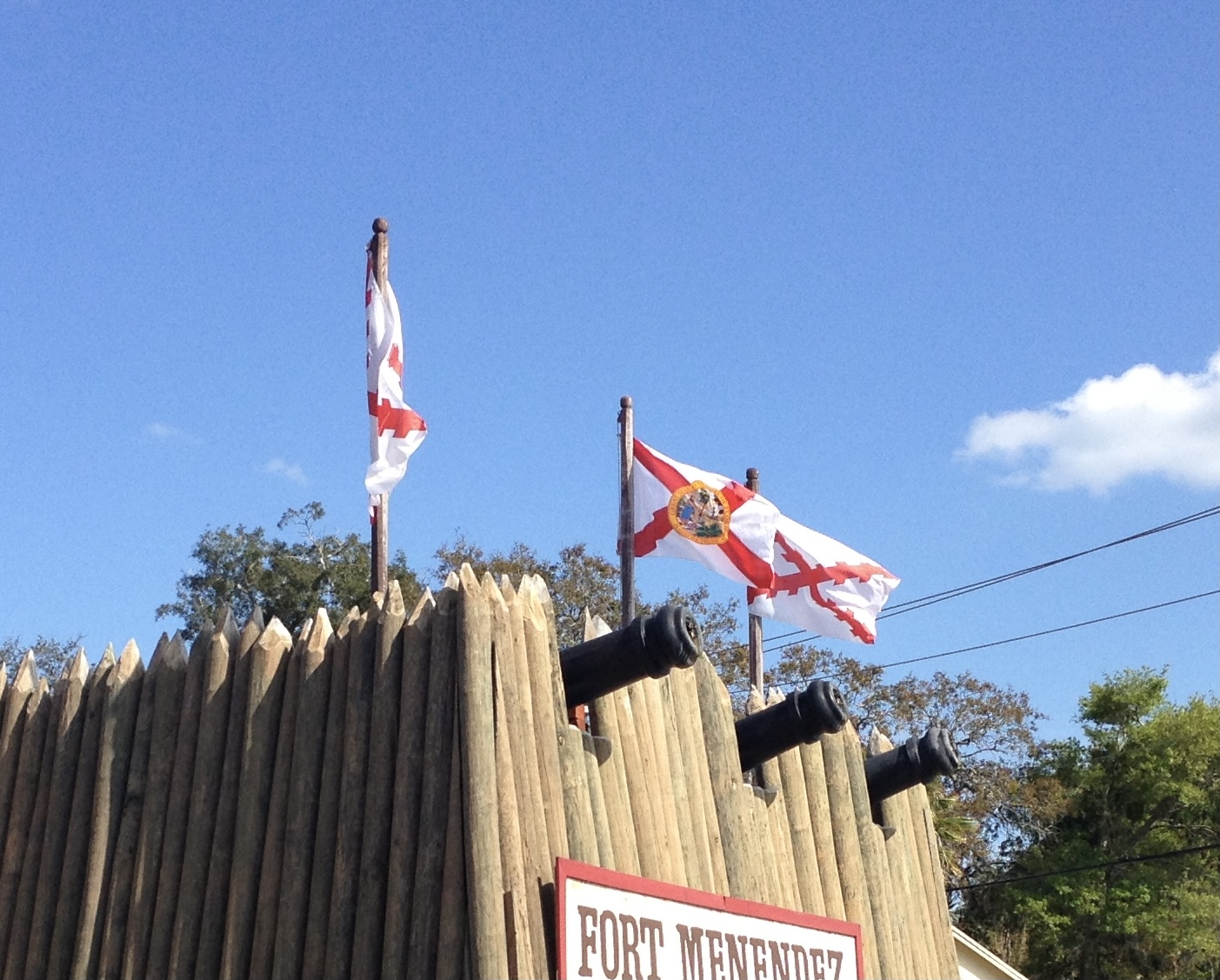
The flag of Florida (center) alongside the Cross of Burgundy in 2013

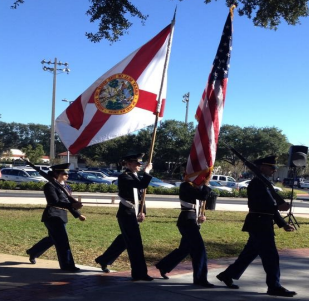
The state flag being carried by Florida National Guard

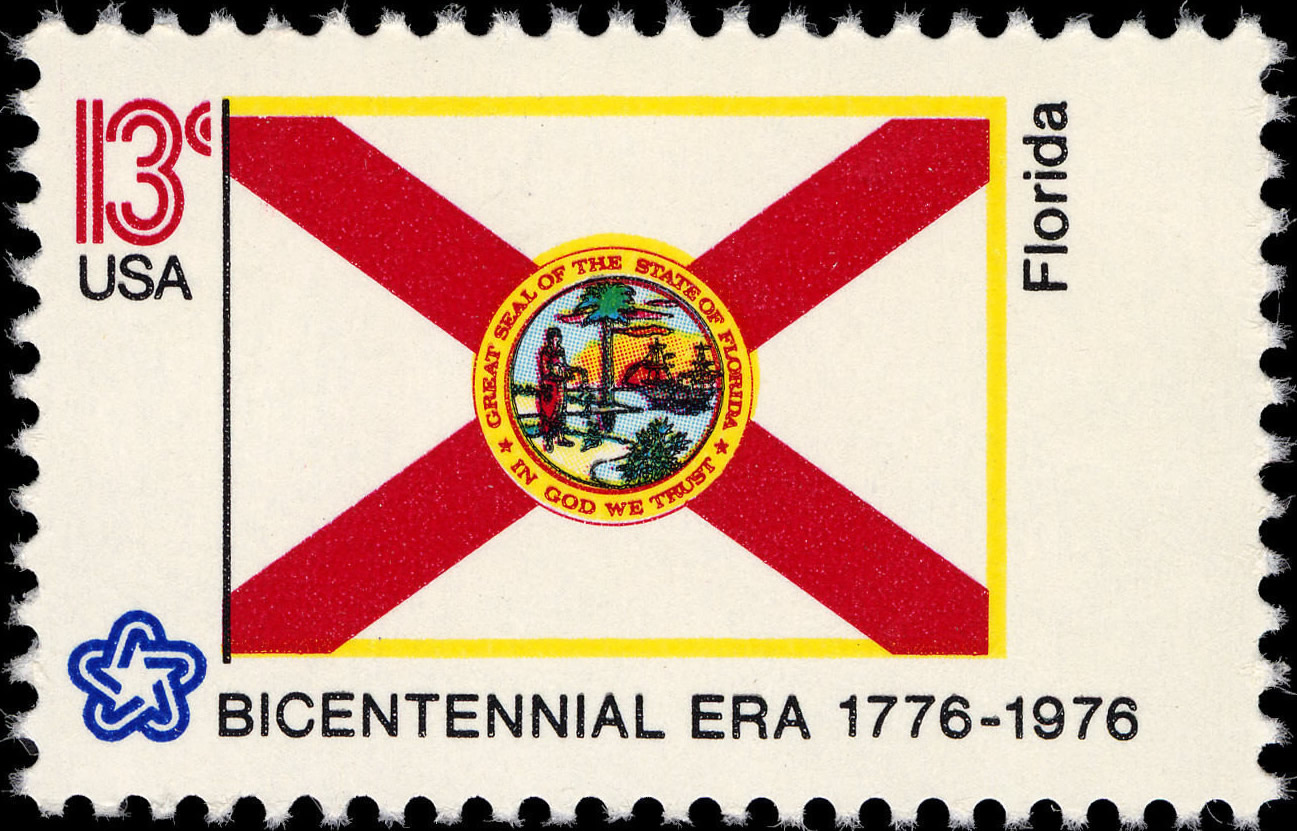
The Florida state flag as depicted in the 1976 bicentennial postage stamp series

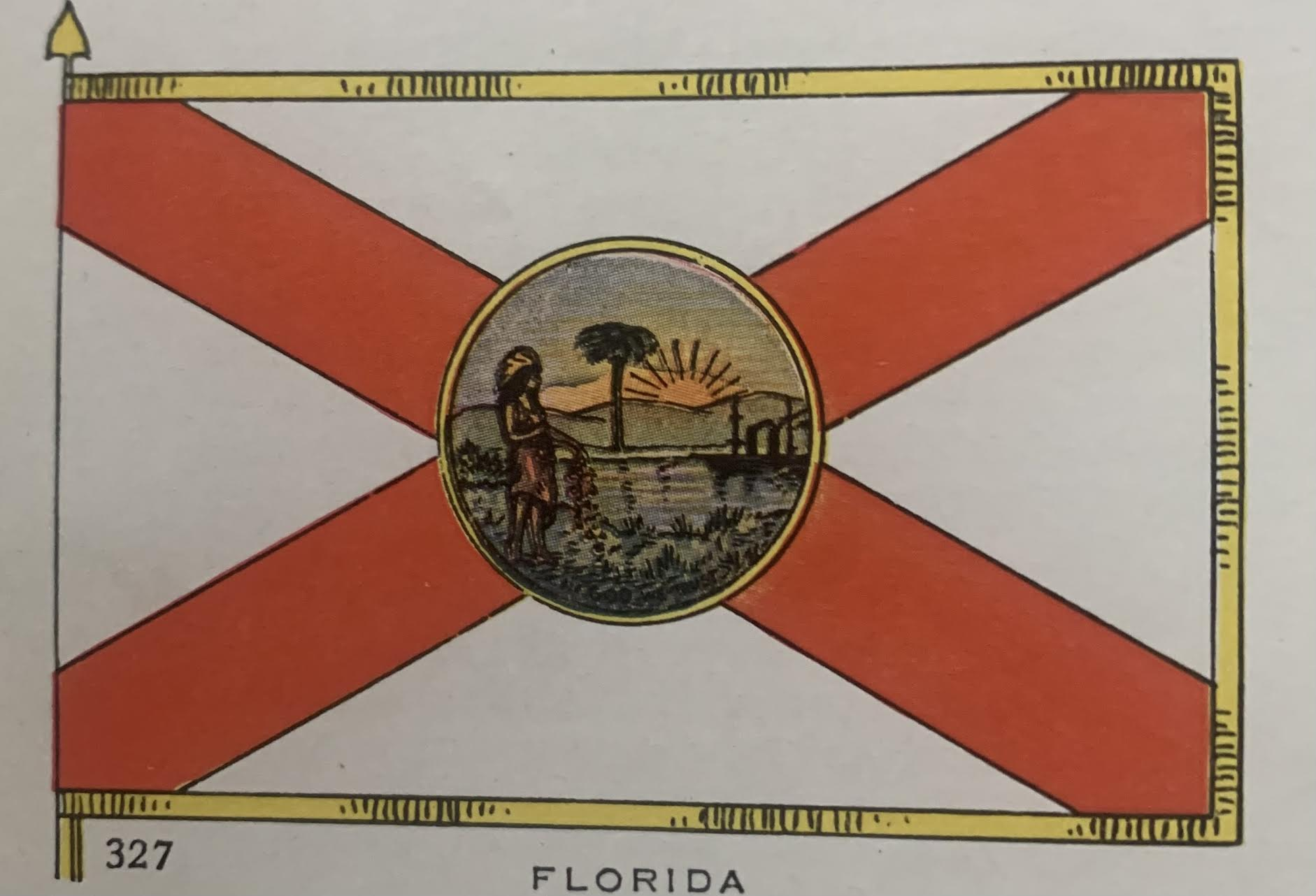
Depiction of the state flag from 1917

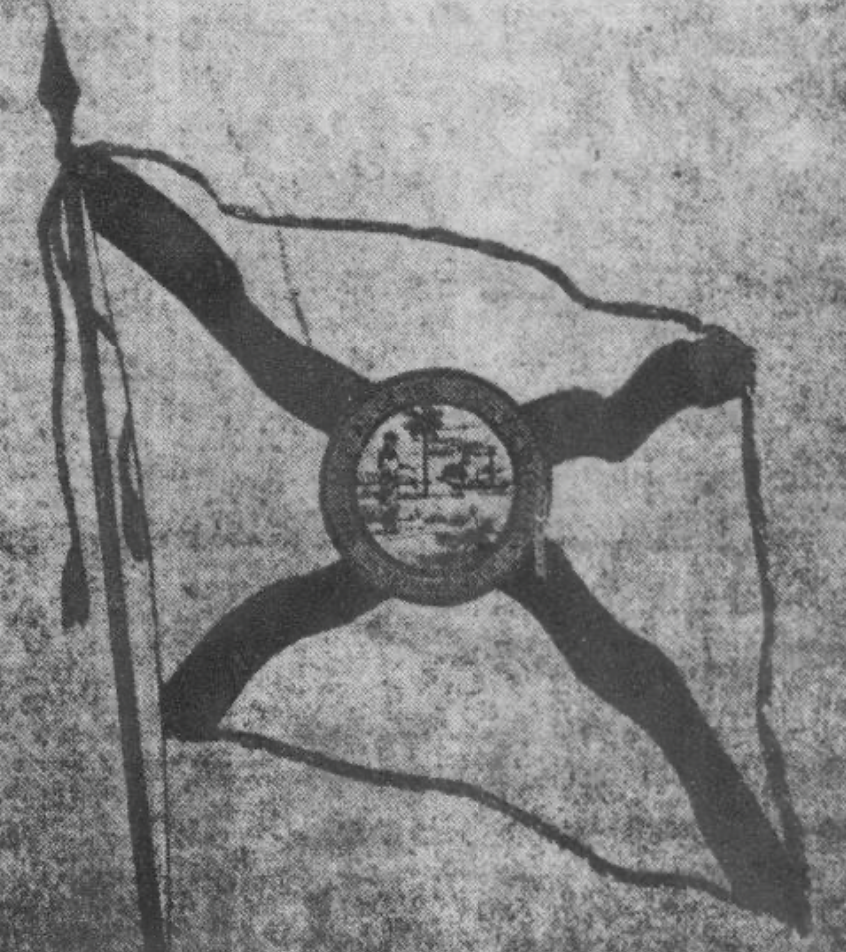
Depiction of the state flag from 1951

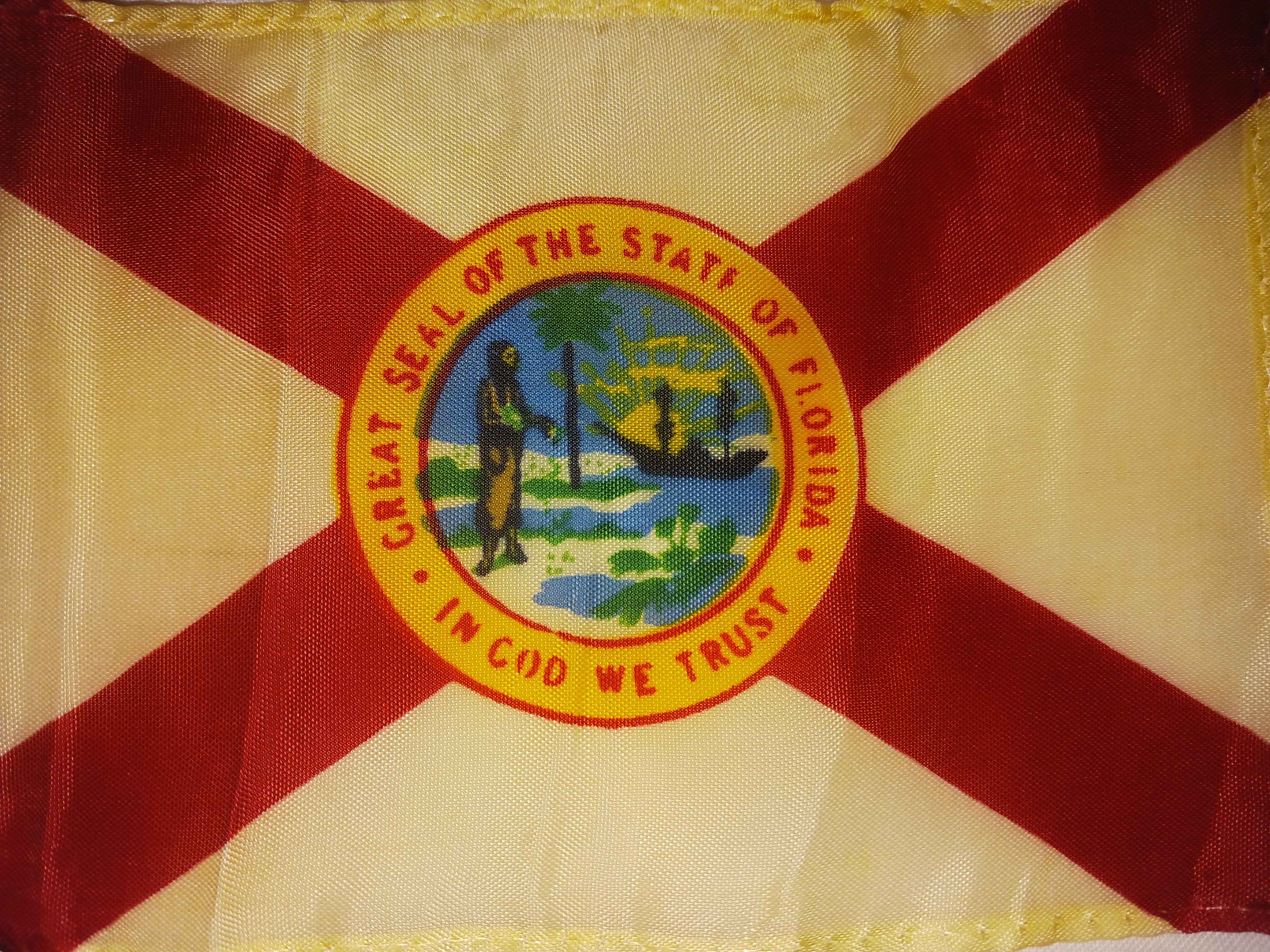
A vintage pre-1985 state flag; note the thin red ring around the seal lacking the pattern and the differences in the seal from the present flag.

== See also ==
- List of flags by design
- List of Florida state symbols
- List of U.S. state, district, and territorial insignia
