= In God We Trust =

National motto of the United States and Nicaragua

- Spanish: En Dios confiamos
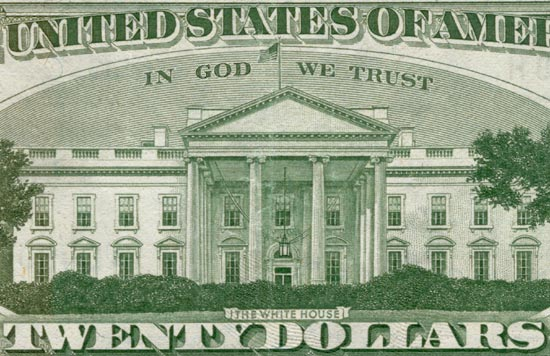
- Capitalized "IN GOD WE TRUST" on the reverse of a United States twenty-dollar bill

Motto of the United States and Nicaragua
- Significance: Trust and faith in God
- Used in: United States, Nicaragua, Florida
- First appeared: 1864

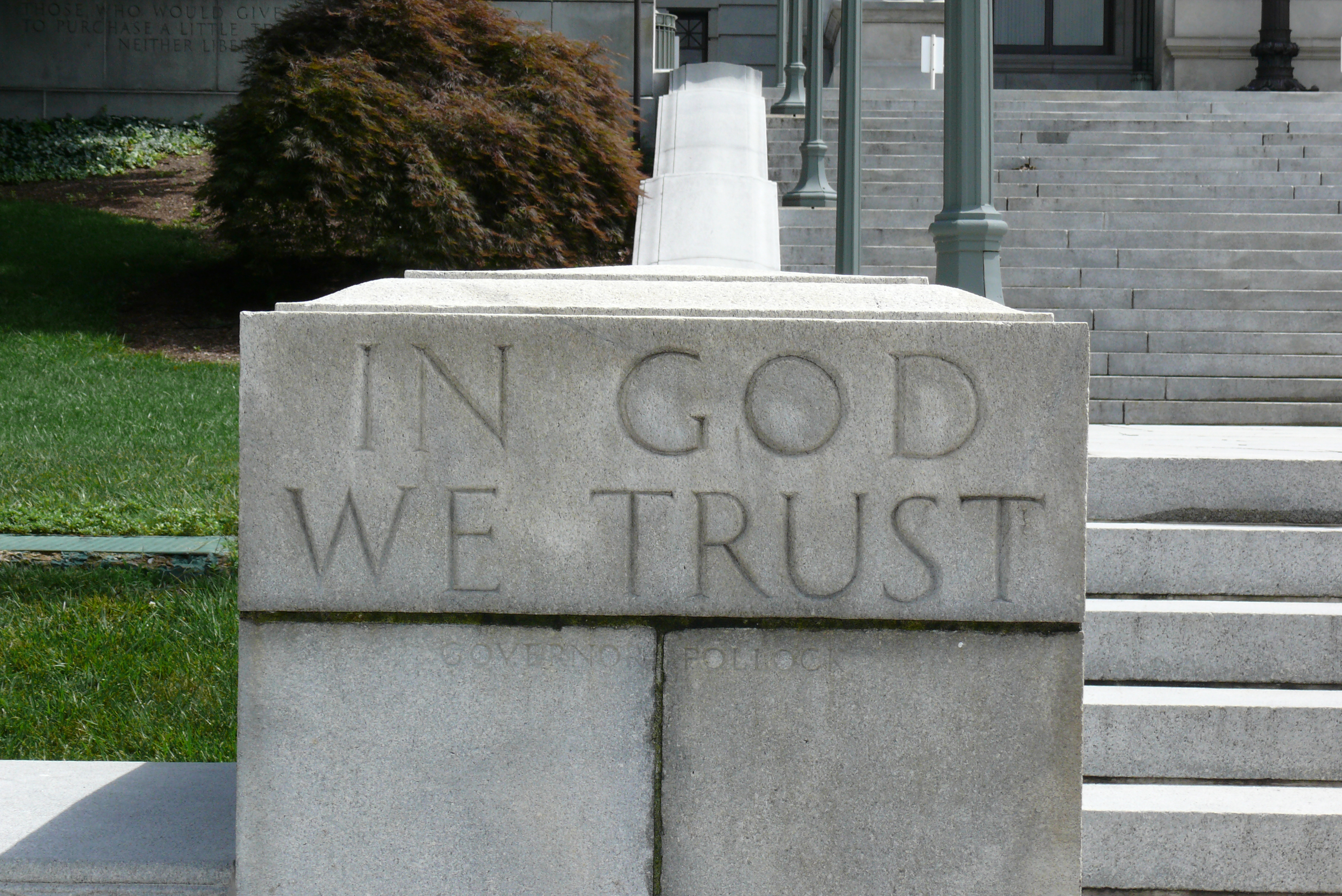
United States national motto, In God We Trust, in ornamental stonework at the Pennsylvania State Capitol

Dime with US national motto
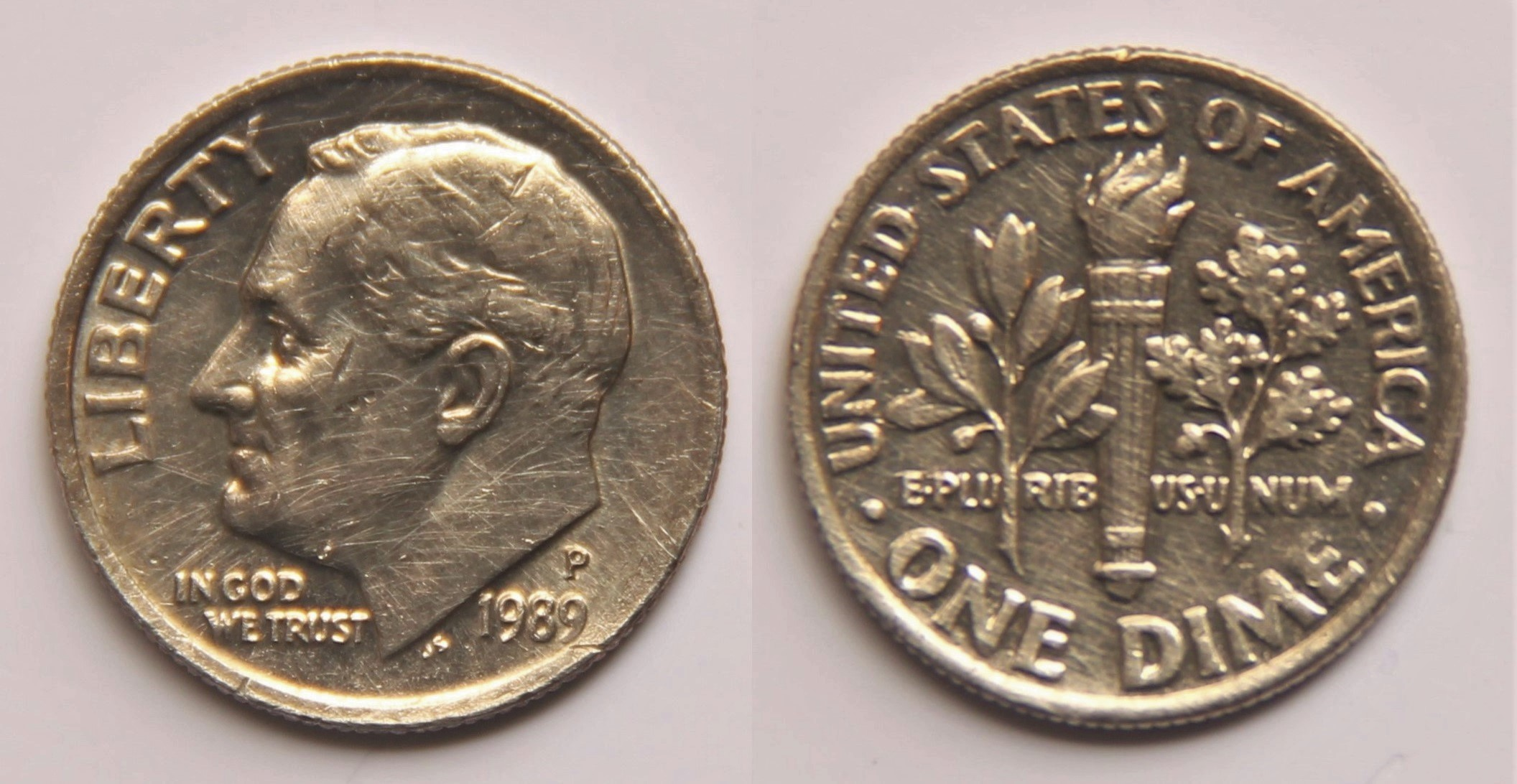
First side of the image: Head of Franklin D. Roosevelt
Second side of the image: Olive branch, torch and oak branch surrounded with value and lettering "United States of America"
Total 86,408,282,060 coins minted from 1965 to 2015.

"In God We Trust" (also rendered as "In God we trust") is the United States national motto, as well as the official motto of the U.S. state of Florida, and the nation of Nicaragua (Spanish: En Dios confiamos). It was adopted by the U.S. Congress in 1956, via a joint resolution, replacing E pluribus unum ("Out of many, one"), which had been the de facto motto since the initial design of the Great Seal of the United States. It was signed in law by President Dwight D. Eisenhower. The phrase first appeared on U.S. coins in 1864.

The fourth stanza of the U.S. national anthem "The Star-Spangled Banner", adopted from the 1814 poem "The Defence of Fort M'Henry", contains the line: "And this be our motto—'In God is our trust'". Written in 1814 by Francis Scott Key (and later adopted as the U.S. national anthem on March 3, 1931, by U.S. President Herbert Hoover), the song contains an early reference to a variation of the phrase. The origins of "In God We Trust" as a political motto lie in the American Civil War, where Union supporters wanted to emphasize their attachment to God and to boost morale.

The capitalized form "IN GOD WE TRUST" first appeared on the two-cent piece in 1864 and initially only appeared on coins, but it gradually became accepted among Americans. Much wider adoption followed in the 1950s. The first postage stamps with the motto appeared in 1954. A law passed in July 1955 by a joint resolution of the 84th Congress (Pub. L. 84–140) and approved by President Dwight Eisenhower requires that "In God We Trust" appear on all American currency. This law was first implemented on the updated one-dollar silver certificate that entered circulation on October 1, 1957. The 84th Congress later passed legislation (Pub. L. 84–851), also signed by President Eisenhower on July 30, 1956, declaring the phrase to be the national motto. (Note: For the relevant statutes, see 36 U.S.C. § 302 and United States Public Law 84-851) Several states have also mandated or authorized its use in public institutions or schools. Florida, Georgia and Mississippi have incorporated the phrase in some of their state symbols. The motto has also been used in some cases in other countries, most notably on Nicaragua's coins.

The motto remains popular among the American public, as most polls indicate. Some groups and people in the United States, however, have objected to its use, contending that its religious reference violates the Establishment Clause of the First Amendment. These groups believe the phrase should be removed from currency and public property, which has resulted in numerous lawsuits. This argument has not overcome the interpretational doctrine of accommodationism and the notion of "ceremonial deism". The former allows the government to endorse religious establishments as long as they are all treated equally, while the latter states that a repetitious invocation of a religious entity in ceremonial matters strips the phrase of its original religious connotation. The New Hampshire Supreme Court, as well as the Second, Fourth, Fifth, Sixth, Eighth, Ninth, and Tenth Circuits, have all upheld the constitutionality of the motto in various settings. The Supreme Court has discussed the motto in footnotes but has never directly ruled on its compliance with the U.S. constitution.

== Origins ==
The earliest recorded usage of the motto in English was in January 1748, when The Pennsylvania Gazette reported on the colours of Associators regiments, namely that of Benjamin Franklin's Pennsylvania militia, one of which said: "IX. A Coronet and Plume of Feathers. Motto, In God we Trust." According to Thomas S. Kidd, an American historian, this appears to be an isolated instance of an official usage, which could be traced to some renderings of Psalm 56:11.

The precise phrase, "In God We Trust" is also found in a publication of Isaac Watts' Psalter which was revised and printed in the United States in 1785. Watts had translated Psalm 115:9–11 with the words, "Britain, trust the Lord." An American publisher, Joel Barlow, sought to revise Watts' Psalter for an American audience. Barlow's goal was to modify Watts in such a way as to purge the un-American flavor. Barlow simply translated Psalm 115:9–11 with the words "In God we Trust."

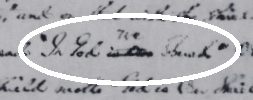
Salmon P. Chase, Treasury Secretary, scribes "In God is Our Trust," scratches out "is Our" and overwrites "We" to arrive at "In God We Trust" in a December 9, 1863, letter to James Pollock, Director of the Philadelphia Mint.

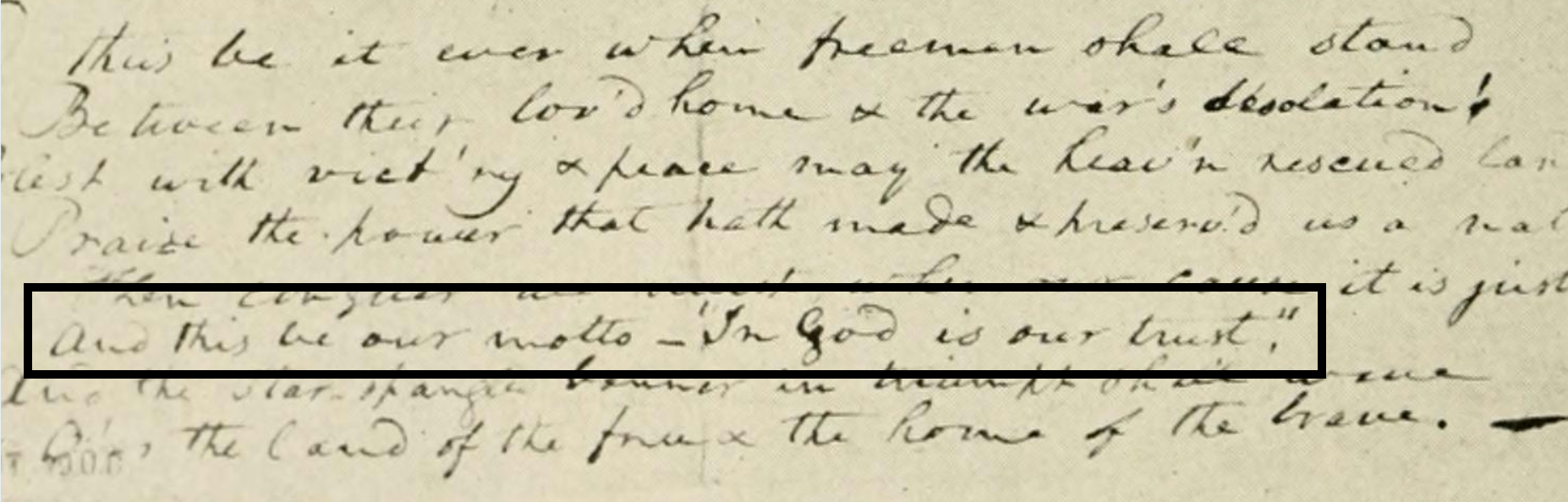
Manuscript copy of Key's 1814 poem "Defence of Fort M'Henry" (better known today as "The Star-Spangled Banner") in which one line of the fourth verse reads, "And this be our motto-"In God is our trust,"" (enclosed section)

There were several other unrelated recordings of the motto. It can be encountered in some literary works of the early 19th century. One of them, "Defence of Fort M'Henry", contained a version of the motto and subsequently became the national anthem of the United States. It also appeared in 1845, when D.S. Whitney published an anti-slavery hymn in The Liberator. Odd Fellows have also used the phrase as their motto from the 1840s at least into the 1870s.

== Motto on U.S. currency ==
=== Initial adoption ===
In a letter dated November 13, 1861, Rev. Mark R. Watkinson of Ridleyville, Pennsylvania (pastor of the Prospect Hill Baptist Church in present-day Prospect Park), petitioned the Treasury Department to add a statement recognizing "Almighty God in some form on our coins" in order to "relieve us from the ignominy of heathenism". At least part of the motivation was to declare that God was on the Union side of the Civil War, given that the Confederacy's constitution, unlike the Union's, invoked God. (Note: See preamble of CSA Constitution: ...invoking the favor and guidance of Almighty God...) This sentiment was shared by other citizens who supported such inclusion in their letters. Indeed, the 125th Pennsylvania Infantry Regiment of the Union Army assumed the motto "In God we trust" in early August 1862.

In the South, the phrase has also gained significant traction. A Confederate bunting with "In God We Trust" printed in the center, dated to late 1861 or early 1862 and attributed to the 37th Arkansas Infantry Regiment, was probably captured by the 33rd Iowa Infantry Regiment at the Battle of Helena and is currently in possession of the Iowa Historical Society. Another flag with exactly the same motto, this time of the 60th Tennessee Infantry Regiment, was captured in the course of the Battle of Big Black River Bridge. Additionally, in 1864, Harper's Weekly reported that the Union Navy had captured a flag whose motto said: "Our cause is just, our duty we know; In God we trust, to battle we go." Other Confederate symbols included close paraphrasing of the motto, such as the banner of the Apalachicola Guard of Florida (In God is our trust) and "The Star-Spangled Cross and the Pure Field of White", a popular song in the Southern military whose refrain contains the following passage: "Our trust is in God, who can help us in fight, And defend those who ask Him in prayer."

President Abraham Lincoln's Treasury Secretary, Salmon P. Chase, a lifelong evangelical Episcopalian who was known for his public shows of piety, acted swiftly on the proposal to include a motto referring to God and directed the then-Philadelphia Director of the Mint and member of the National Reform Association, James Pollock, to begin drawing up possible designs that would include the religious phrase. Chase chose his favorite designs and presented a proposal to the Congress for the new designs in late 1863. He then decided on the final version of the new motto, "In God We Trust," in December 1863. Walter H. Breen, a numismatist, wrote that Chase drew inspiration from the motto of Brown University of Providence, Rhode Island, In Deo speramus, which is Latin for a similarly sounding "In God we hope". President Lincoln's degree of involvement in the process of the motto's approval is unclear, though he was aware of such talks. (Note: According to the Congressional Record (1908, U.S. House of Representatives), p. 3387, the motto was adopted "doubtless with his [Lincoln's] knowledge and approval".)

As Chase was preparing his recommendation to Congress, it was found that the federal legislature passed a bill on January 18, 1837, which determined the mottos and devices that should be stamped on U.S. coins. This meant that enactment of some additional legislation was necessary before "In God We Trust" could be engraved. Such a bill was introduced and passed as the Coinage Act of 1864 on April 22, 1864, allowing the Secretary of the Treasury to authorize the inclusion of the phrase on one-cent and two-cent coins.

On March 3, 1865, the U.S. Congress passed a bill, which Lincoln subsequently signed as the last act of Congress prior to his assassination, that allowed the Mint Director to place "In God We Trust" on all gold and silver coins that "shall admit the inscription thereon", subject to the Secretary's approval. In 1873, Congress passed another Coinage Act, granting the Secretary of the Treasury the right to "cause the motto 'IN GOD WE TRUST' to be inscribed on such coins as shall admit of such motto".

In God We Trust (or, rarely, its variation, God We Trust) first appeared on 2¢ coins, which were first minted in 1863 and went into mass circulation the following year. According to David W. Lange, a numismatist, the inclusion of the motto on a coin was a major driver for the popularisation of the slogan. Other coins, that is, nickels, quarter dollars, half dollars, half eagles and eagles, have had In God We Trust engraved from 1866 on. Dollar coins got the motto in 1873 for trade dollars and 1878 for common circulation Morgan dollars. However, there was no obligation for the motto to be used, so some denominations still didn't have it. Others, such as nickels, have seen the phrase disappear after a redesign, so that by the late 19th century, most of the coins did not bear the motto. Finally, in 1892, an oversight caused the Coinage Act to lose the language which mandated inclusion of the phrase.

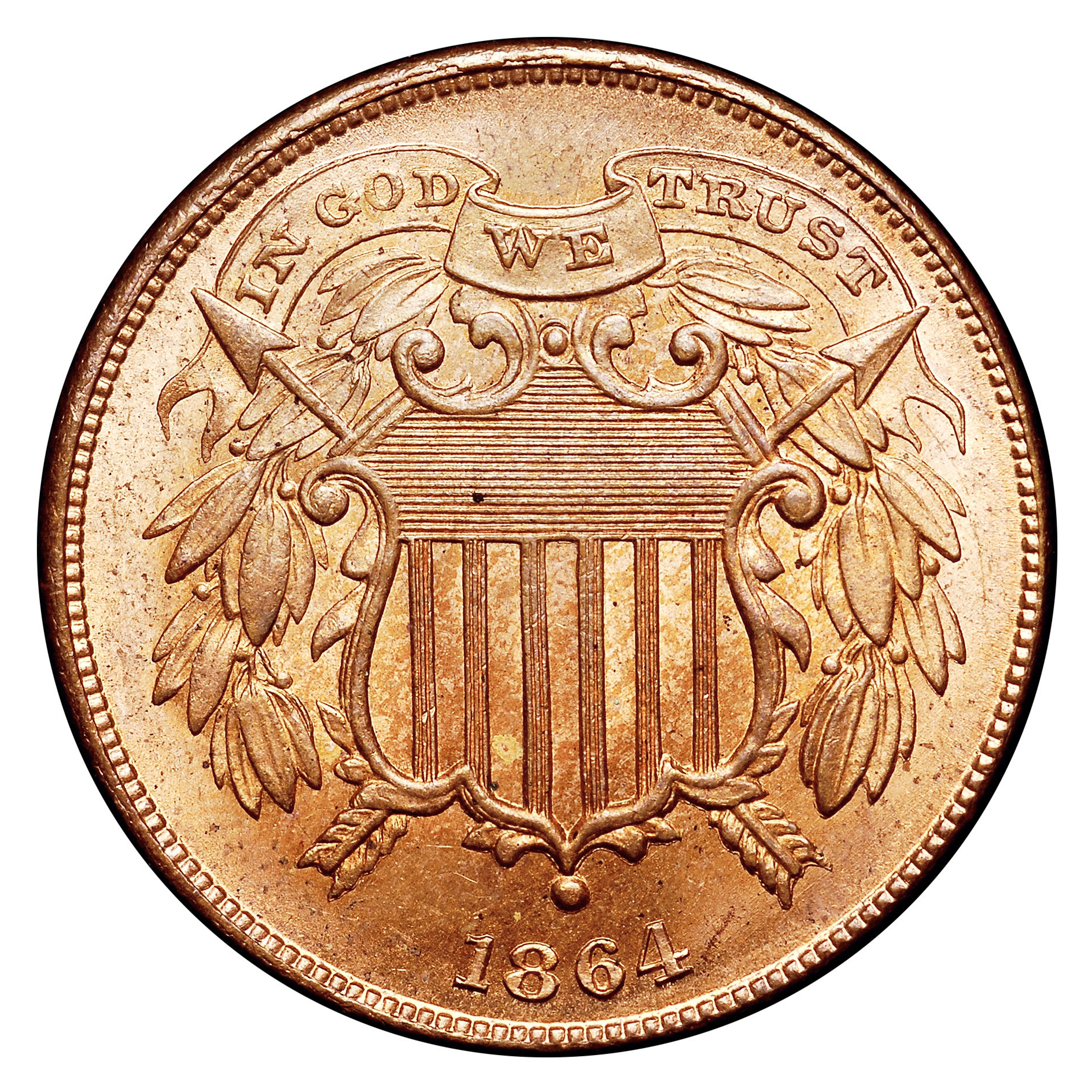
"IN GOD WE TRUST" first appeared on the obverse side of the two-cent piece in 1864.

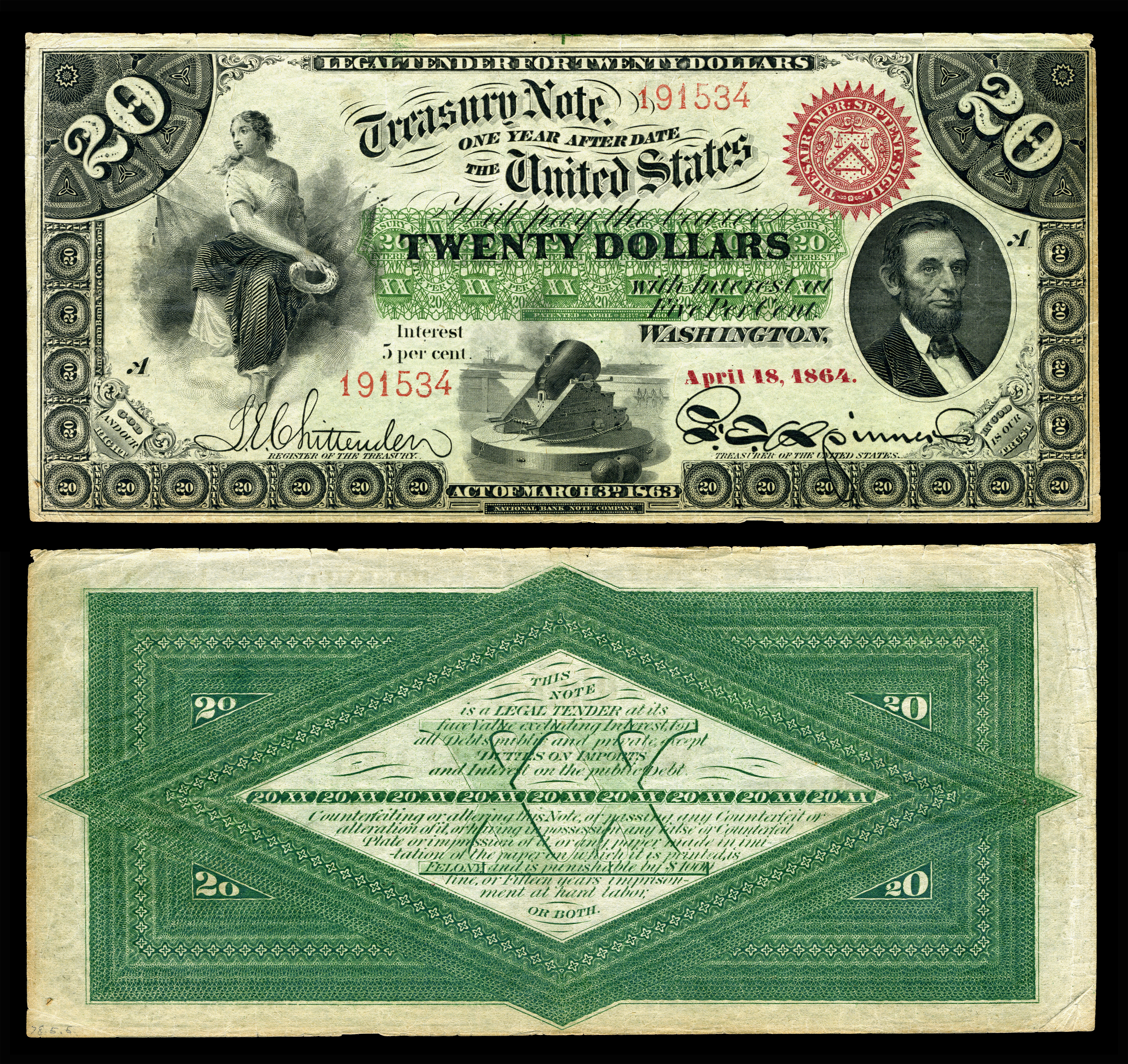
$20 interest-bearing note from 1864; "in god is our trust" appears on the bottom-right shield.

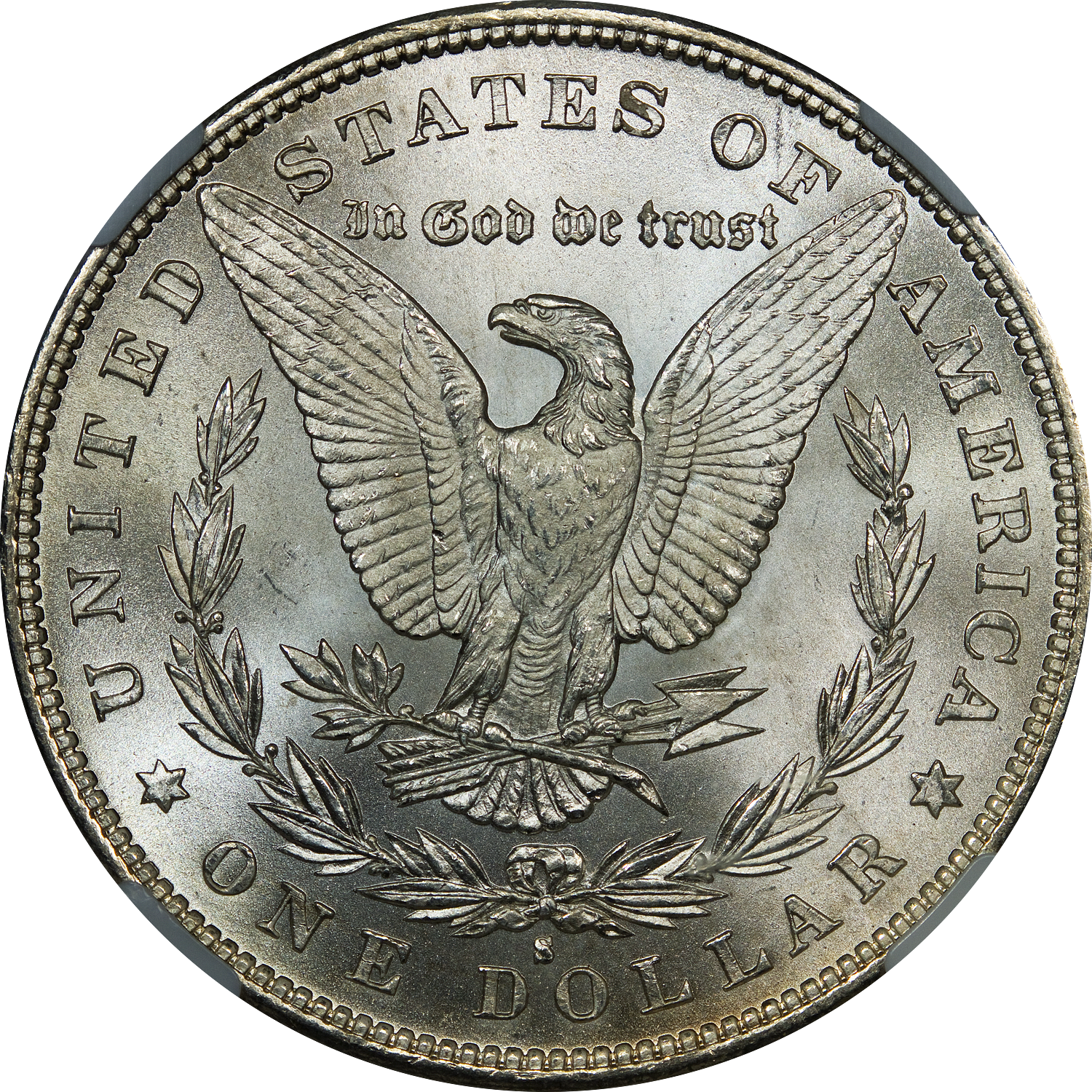
The reverse of the Morgan dollar presented the lower-cased "In God we trust".

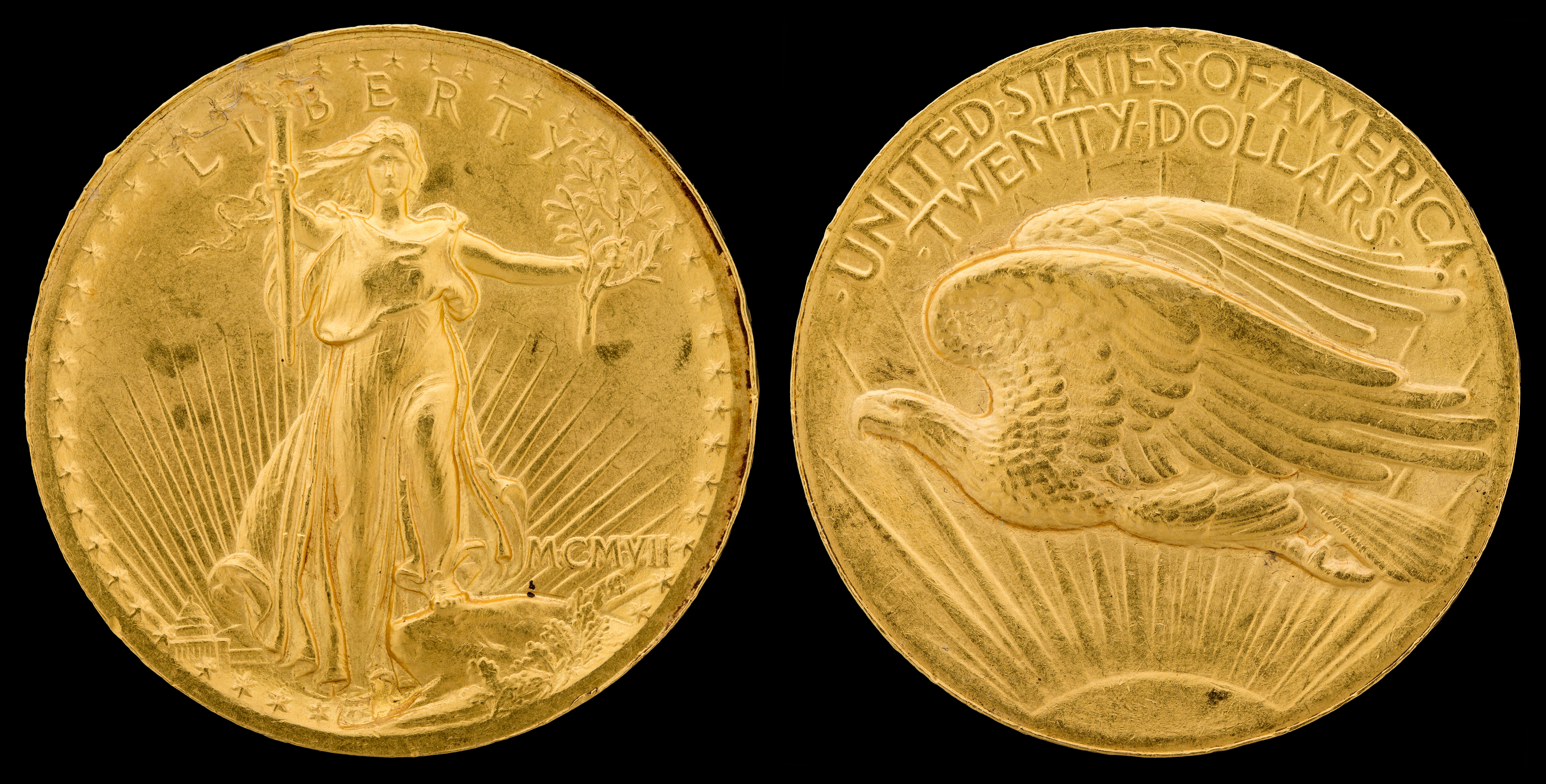
Saint-Gaudens double eagle ("high relief" version), subject of public outcry in 1907 due to the lack of "In God we Trust" on the coin

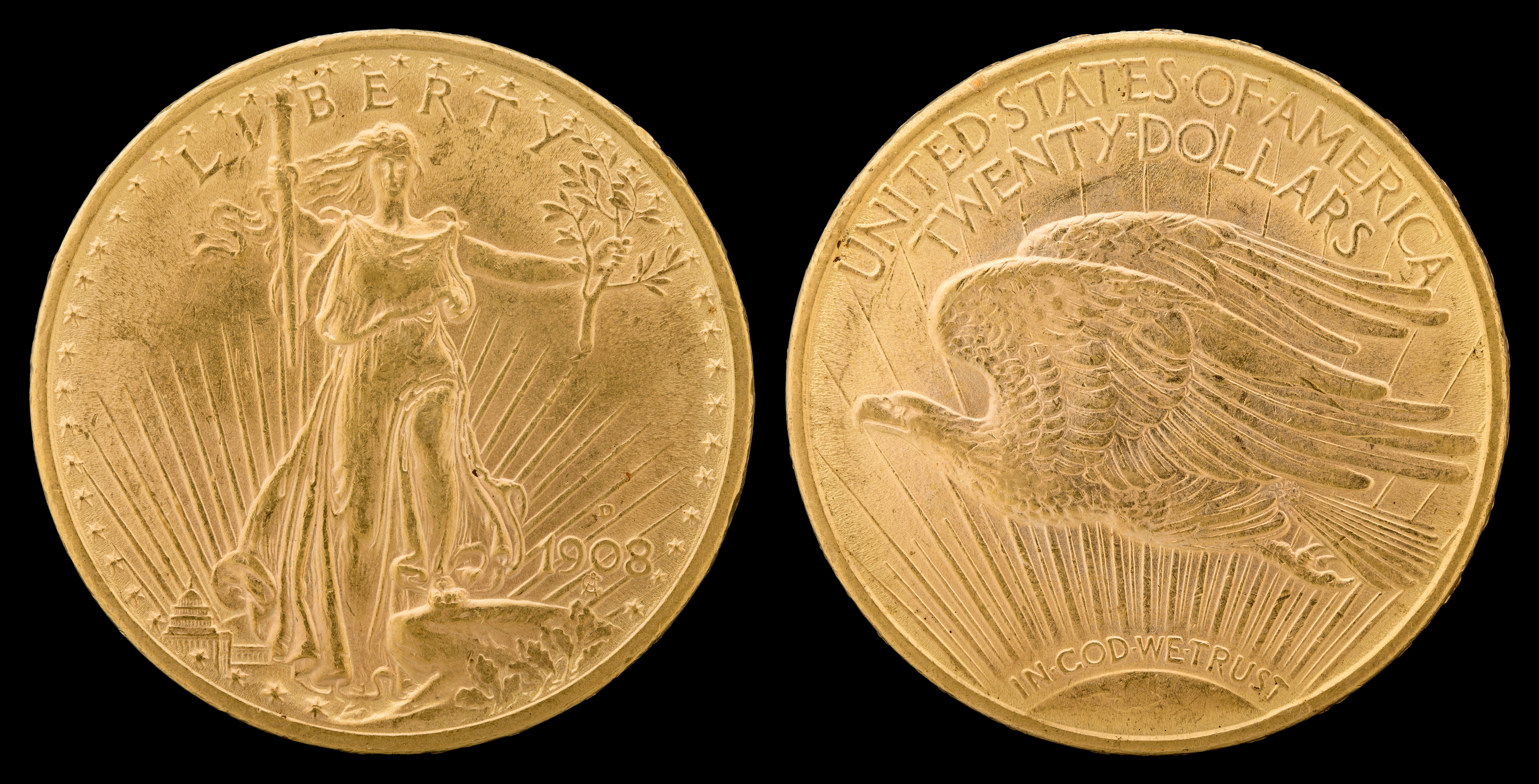
Version with the national motto, 1908

Banknotes did not have formal authorization, or mandate, to have "In God We Trust" engraved until 1955. However, a version of the motto (In God Is Our Trust) first made a brief appearance on the obverse side of the 1864 $20 interest-bearing and compound interest treasury notes, along with the motto "God and our Right".

==== Reactions ====
The initial reaction of the general populace was far from unanimous approval. On the one hand, Christian newspapers were generally happy with the phrase being included in coins, though some advocated for more religiously connoted mottos, such as "In God alone is our trust" or "God our Christ". On the other, non-religious press was less impressed by the developments. The New York Times editorial board asked to "let us try to carry our religion—such as it is—in our hearts, and not in our pockets." and criticized the Mint for including the motto only on golden and larger silver coins. New York Illustrated News ridiculed the new coins for marking "the first time that God has ever been recognized on any of our counters of Mammon," with a similar comparison made by the Detroit Free Press. The different opinions on its inclusion eventually grew into a dispute between secularists and faith congregations. Others still started to make jokes of "In God We Trust". The American Journal of Numismatics suggested that people would misread the motto as "In Gold we Trust", which they said was "much nearer the fact". Newspapers also started reporting on puns made of the slogan. Already in 1860s, newspapers reported signs reading "In God we Trust – terms cash," "In God we trust. All others are expected to pay cash" and the like.

The phrase, however, gradually became a symbol of national pride. Just six years after it first appeared on coins, the San Francisco Chronicle called it "our nation's motto"; similarly, groups as diverse as prohibitionists and suffragists, pacifists and nativists, Democrats and Republicans, Christians and Jews all adopted the motto or endorsed its usage by the end of the 19th century. The motto stayed popular even as fewer denominations had "In God We Trust" embossed on coins.

=== 1907 Saint-Gaudens coins controversy ===
In 1904, President Theodore Roosevelt sought to beautify American coinage and decided to give the task to his friend, Augustus Saint-Gaudens, who, after several delays and technical issues with his design, produced a new design for eagles and double eagles. Roosevelt specifically instructed Saint-Gaudens not to include "In God We Trust" on the coins, as the President feared that these coins would be used to further ungodly activities, such as gambling, and facilitate crime. Saint-Gaudens did not oppose the order, as he thought that the phrase would distract from the coin's design features.

The coin, whose ultra-high relief version is now considered one of the most beautiful coins ever struck in the U.S., was indeed appreciated for its esthetics by art critics. However, a scandal immediately erupted over the lack of "In God We Trust" on the eagles and double eagles. Theodore Roosevelt insisted that while he was in favor of placing the motto on public buildings and monuments, doing so for money (or postage stamps and advertisements) would be "dangerously close to sacrilege":

"My own feeling in the matter is due to my very firm conviction that to put such a motto on coins, or to use it in any kindred manner, not only does no good, but does positive harm, and is in effect irreverence, which comes dangerously close to sacrilege. ... Any use which tends to cheapen it, and, above all, any use which tends to secure its being treated in a spirit of levity, is from every standpoint profoundly to be regretted. ... it seems to me eminently unwise to cheapen such a motto by use on coins ... In all my life I have never heard any human being speak reverently of this motto on the coins or show any signs of its having appealed to any high emotion in him, but I have literally, hundreds of times, heard it used as an occasion of and incitement to ... sneering ... Every one must remember the innumerable cartoons and articles based on phrases like 'In God we trust for the 8 cents,' ... Surely, I am well within bounds when I say that a use of the phrase which invites constant levity of this type is most undesirable."

— President Theodore Roosevelt, 13 November 1907

Press response was largely negative. Most news outlets affiliated with Christian organisations, as well as The Wall Street Journal, The Philadelphia Press and other newspapers were critical of the decision, with accusations amounting to the President being guilty of premeditated assault on religion and disregard for Americans' religious sentiments. Atlanta Constitution wrote that people were to choose between "God and Roosevelt", while The New York Sun published a poem mocking Roosevelt's attitude. In contrast, The New York Times, Chicago Tribune, and some religious newspapers such as The Churchman, sided with the President, who was both stunned and irritated by people's opposition to excluding the motto. This prompted debate in Congress, which quickly decided to reinstate the motto on the coins in an act adopted in 1908. As a result of controversy, relevant design changes were subsequently introduced by the Mint Chief Engraver, Charles E. Barber.

Other coins have also retained or renewed the usage of the motto. All gold coins and silver $1 coins, half dollars and quarters have had the motto engraved since July 1, 1908; pennies followed in 1909 and dimes in 1916. Since 1938, all U.S. coins have borne the "In God We Trust" inscription on them.

=== Road to universal mandate ===
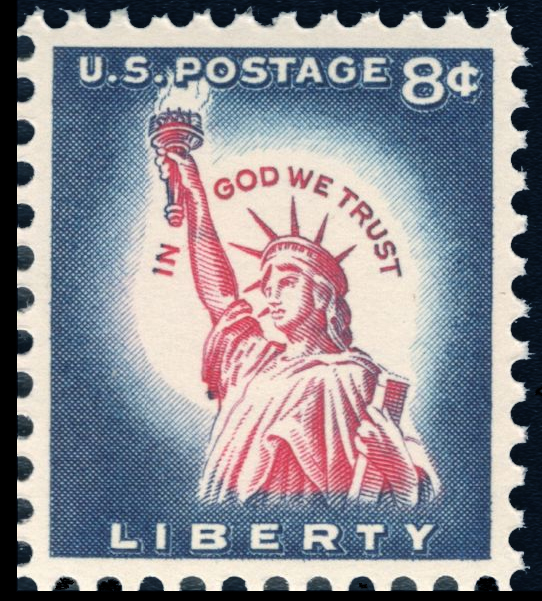
8¢ postage stamp from 1954, with the motto inscribed around the Statue of Liberty's head. At the time, eight cents was the standard rate for international postage. A 3¢ (domestic mail rate) stamp with a similar design was also issued.

It is generally thought that during the Cold War era, the government of the United States sought to distinguish itself from the Soviet Union, which promoted state atheism and thus implemented antireligious legislation, therefore, a debate for further usage of religious motto was started in Congress. Kevin M. Kruse offers an alternative explanation. In his book, he argues that conservative opposition to the New Deal, and those politicians' subsequent successful campaigns to expand the influence of religion, were the main factors that contributed to further adoption of "In God We Trust".

The Eisenhower administration struck a deeply religious tone, which proved a fertile ground for lobbying for inclusion of the motto in more contexts. This is often attributed to the influence of Billy Graham, a prominent evangelist of the time. After intense public pressure for inclusion of the national motto, it appeared for the first time on some postage stamps of the 1954 Liberty Issue, though lobbying for universal inclusion by Michigan Senator Charles E. Potter and Representative Louis C. Rabaut failed.

The following year, Democratic Representative Charles Edward Bennett of Florida cited the Cold War when he introduced H. R. 619, which obliged "In God we trust" to be printed on all banknotes and struck on all coins, in the House, arguing that "[in] these days when imperialistic and materialistic communism seeks to attack and destroy freedom, we should continually look for ways to strengthen the foundations of our freedom". The American Numismatic Association and the American Legion concurred and made resolutions urging to promote further usage of "In God We Trust".

On July 11, 1955, the bill, having passed with bipartisan support of both chambers of Congress, was signed into law by President Eisenhower. Since all coins already complied with the law, the only changes were made to the paper currency. The motto first appeared on the $1 silver certificate in 1957, followed by other certificates. Federal Reserve Notes and United States Notes were circulated with the motto starting from 1964 to 1966, depending on the denomination. (Note: Quoting the peroration (abridged here) of the speech by Charles Edward Bennett, sponsor in the House, the only speech in either House of Congress on the subject. President Eisenhower and W. Randolph Burgess, Deputy to the Treasury for Monetary Affairs, had approved of the legislation. 101 Congressional Record pp. 4384 (quoted), 7796. (1955))

== Adoption and display by government institutions in the United States ==
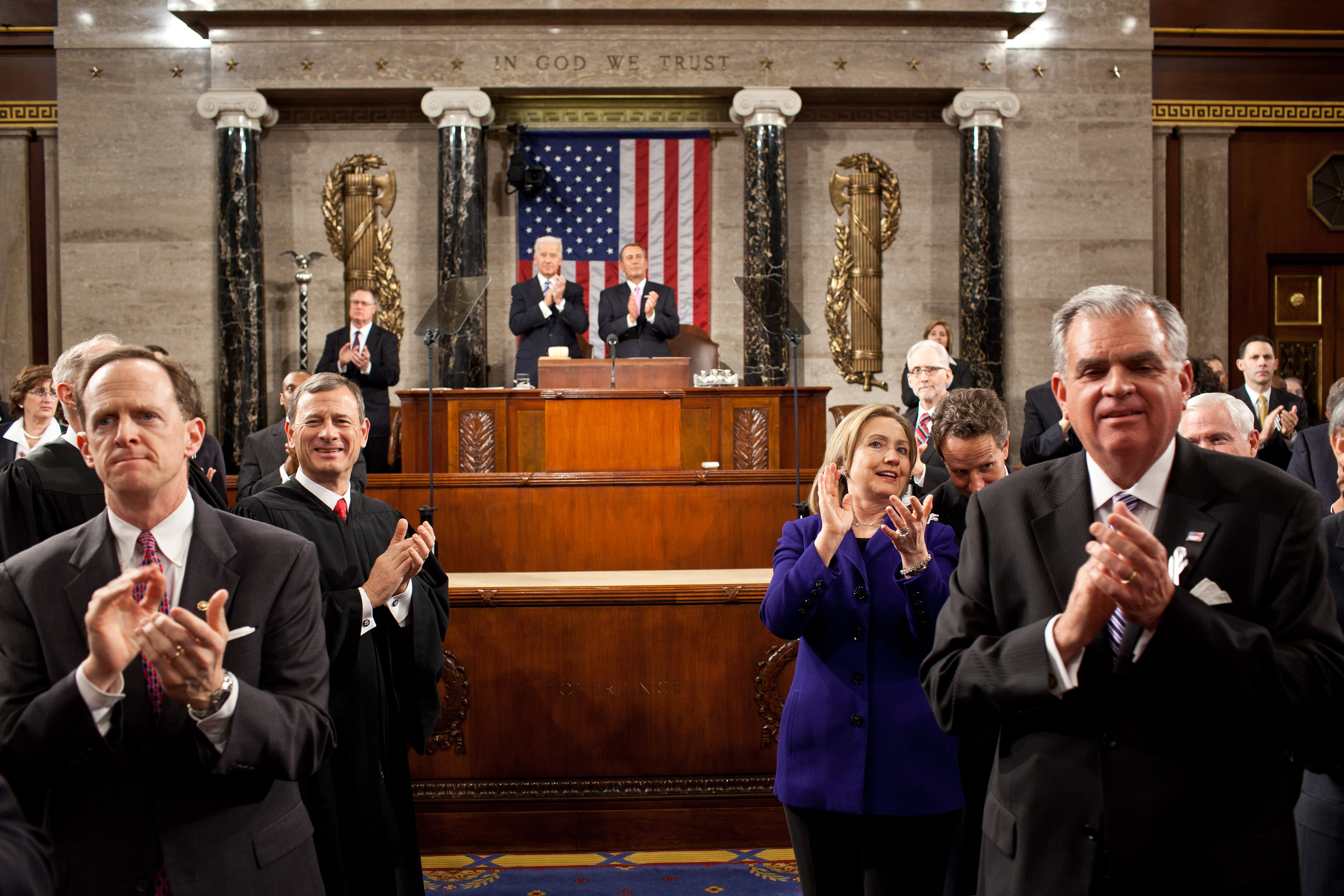
The rostrum of the House of Representatives, where the Speaker sits. The national motto carved in marble can be seen at the top of the image.

The 1956 law was the first to establish an official motto for the country, although E pluribus unum ("Out of many, one") was adopted by an Act of Congress in 1782 as the motto for the Seal of the United States and has been used on coins and paper money since 1795.

The change from "E Pluribus Unum" to "In God we trust" was generally considered uncontroversial at the time, given the rising influence of organized religion and pressures of the Cold War era in the 1950s. The 1956 law was one of several legislative actions Congress took to differentiate the United States from atheistic communism. Earlier, a 1954 act added the words "under God" to the Pledge of Allegiance. Some states also adopted mottos with religious overtones during this time, for example Ohio's "With God, all things are possible".

The constitutionality of the modern national motto has been questioned with relationship to the separation of church and state outlined in the First Amendment. In 1970, in Aronow v. United States, the United States Court of Appeals for the Ninth Circuit ruled that the motto does not violate the First Amendment to the Constitution. The United States Supreme Court has not ruled on the issue.

=== Federal government ===
On July 30, 1956, the 84th Congress passed a joint resolution "declaring 'IN GOD WE TRUST' the national motto of the United States", which is codified under 36 U.S.C. § 302. The resolution passed both the House and the Senate unanimously and without debate. (Note: For the relevant statutes, see 36 U.S.C. § 302 and United States Public Law 84-851) E pluribus unum previously existed as a de facto official motto. The congressional resolution was reaffirmed in 2006, on the 50th anniversary of its adoption, by the Senate, and in 2011 by the House of Representatives, in a 396 to 9 vote. In 2000, the House additionally encouraged to publicly display the motto.

In December 1962, the motto was carved above the rostrum of the Speaker of the House in response to the backlash against the Supreme Court's decision in Engel v. Vitale, which banned government-authored public school prayers.

Seal of Florida, which also appears on the state's flag. IN GOD WE TRUST appears at the bottom of the seal.

=== State and local governments ===
==== Adoption of the national motto in state symbols ====
In Florida, HB 1145 provided for the adoption of "In God We Trust" as the official state motto, instead of fairly similar "In God Is Our Trust", effective July 1, 2006. The motto has also appeared on the state seal and the state flag, as the seal is one of its elements, since 1868.

Georgia's flag features the motto since 2001, which was retained after a redesign two years later.

In Mississippi, the state senate voted to add the words, "In God We Trust" to the state seal, justifying it as an effort to protect religious freedom. The change was made effective on July 1, 2014. Six years later, Mississippi Governor Tate Reeves signed into law a bill requiring that the state's flag, which had contained the Confederate battle emblem, be replaced with a new one containing the phrase "In God We Trust." A new flag containing the motto was approved by voters in a referendum, and it became the official state flag in January 2021.

On April 28, 2023, Governor Bill Lee of Tennessee signed a bill that would require him to submit a new state seal design which includes the national motto. The secretary of state should receive the proposal by July 1, 2025.

A map of U.S. states with display of the national motto in public schools and government buildings as of April 2025 Display in schools mandated Display in at least some government buildings mandated Display in schools mandated if a copy of the motto is donated Display in schools allowed Display in government buildings allowed Note. Florida, Georgia and Mississippi use the national motto in state symbols, therefore the display of In God We Trust as it appears on state symbols is regulated by laws governing their usage.

==== Mandating display ====
- Arkansas: In March 2017, Act 911, sponsored by state Representative Jim Dotson, made it a requirement of Arkansas state law for public schools to display posters with the national motto, if these were donated. In 2019, the law was later amended to require public display of the national motto in public schools, higher education institutions and state government buildings, if funds are available for that purpose.
- Florida: In early 2018, Kimberly Daniels, a Democrat state representative, introduced HB 839, a bill that requires public schools to display the motto "In God We Trust" in a conspicuous place. On February 21, 2018, the bill passed 97–10 in the House. Governor Rick Scott then signed the mandate into law.
- Idaho: House Concurrent Resolution 32, adopted in March 2020, mandates that the national motto be placed over the chairs of presiding officers of both chambers of Idaho Legislature.
- Kentucky: In 2014, a law was passed that obliged display of the national motto in legislative buildings and in committees. In June 2019, a bill sponsored by state representative Brandon Reed of Hodgenville was passed that required Kentucky public schools to display the motto in a prominent location, beginning from the 2019–20 school year. To protest the requirement, Fayette County Public Schools, a school district which serves Lexington, complied by posting framed one-dollar bills, which bear the slogan, while in LaRue County, of which Hodgenville is seat, schools were using oversized images of pennies.
- Louisiana: A bill requiring public display of the motto in public schools was introduced by state senator Regina Ashford Barrow in March 2018. It was passed unanimously both in the Senate (33 to 0) and in the House (93 to 0) and signed into law by Governor John Bel Edwards in May that year. The bill also mandated school instruction about "In God We Trust" as part of the social studies curriculum. In August 2023, another law required the motto to be hung in each classroom.
- Mississippi: In March 2001, Governor Ronnie Musgrove signed legislation requiring the motto "In God We Trust" to be displayed in every public school classroom, as well as the school auditoriums and cafeterias, throughout the state.
- Ohio: Ohio requires public schools to hang material featuring the motto if school districts receive it as donation, or if money is donated with the stated purpose of buying such materials.
- South Dakota: In March 2019, South Dakota required public schools to prominently display "In God We Trust" motto on their walls, starting from the 2019–20 school year.
- Tennessee: In March 2018, a bill sponsored by state representative Susan Lynn, which requires Tennessee schools to prominently display "In God We Trust" passed the state House 81–18. After being approved unanimously in the Senate, it was signed by Governor Bill Haslam into law the following month.
- Texas: Texas allowed display of the motto in public schools and higher education institutions since 2003. The Texas Legislature then passed a bill in 2021 to mandate donated copies of the motto to be hung in a "conspicuous place" in a collage that should, aside from the motto, also include the United States flag and the Texas flag, but nothing more. Two years later, another bill prohibited anyone from denying the possibility to hang such mottos.
- Virginia: A regulation that obliges all Virginia schools to publicly display the motto was signed into law in May 2002.
- Utah: Utah's law that obliges schools to publicly display "In God We Trust" was signed into law in March 2002 by Governor Mike Leavitt. The law also mandates school instruction about the motto.
- West Virginia: Senate Bill 280 mandates display of the national motto in all educational establishments in the state; the motto must be displayed in a frame with the United States flag only. The bill was signed into law on April 29, 2025, by Patrick Morrisey.

==== Allowing display ====
- Alabama: A 2018 law allows display of the motto in schools, libraries, government buildings, and on law enforcement vehicles.
- Arizona: Arizona allows public display of the motto in public schools.
- Georgia: Georgia allows for usage of the national motto in schools and government buildings, provided they have funds for pay for its display.
- Indiana: Indiana allows display of the national motto in public schools since 2005.
- Michigan: Michigan allows and encourages the display of the motto in and on public schools as well as state and local government buildings.
- New Hampshire: HB 69, introduced in April 2021, initially proposed to require schools to display the national and state motto's, and passed the House 204–169. It was amended in the Senate to simply allow publication of the mottos and approved on May 13, 2021, which was approved by the House the following month. The bill was signed into law by Governor Chris Sununu on July 30, 2021.
- North Dakota: North Dakota statute allows display of the national motto in public schools.
- Oklahoma: A bill was passed in 2004 that allowed public schools to display "In God We Trust" and E pluribus unum in classrooms, auditoriums and cafeterias; a 2018 Senate bill to mandate such display died in the House.
- South Carolina: South Carolina allows political subdivisions and schools to post a display detailing the foundations of the American law and government, of which the national motto is one of thirteen documents, while providing context to these documents in terms detailed by the state statute.

Several local governments have introduced the display of the motto in government buildings and municipal cars. School boards have also seen voluntary introduction of the motto, particularly after the September 11 attacks, when the American Family Association supplied several 11-by-14-inch posters to school systems and vowed to defend any legal challenges to their display.

== Society and culture ==
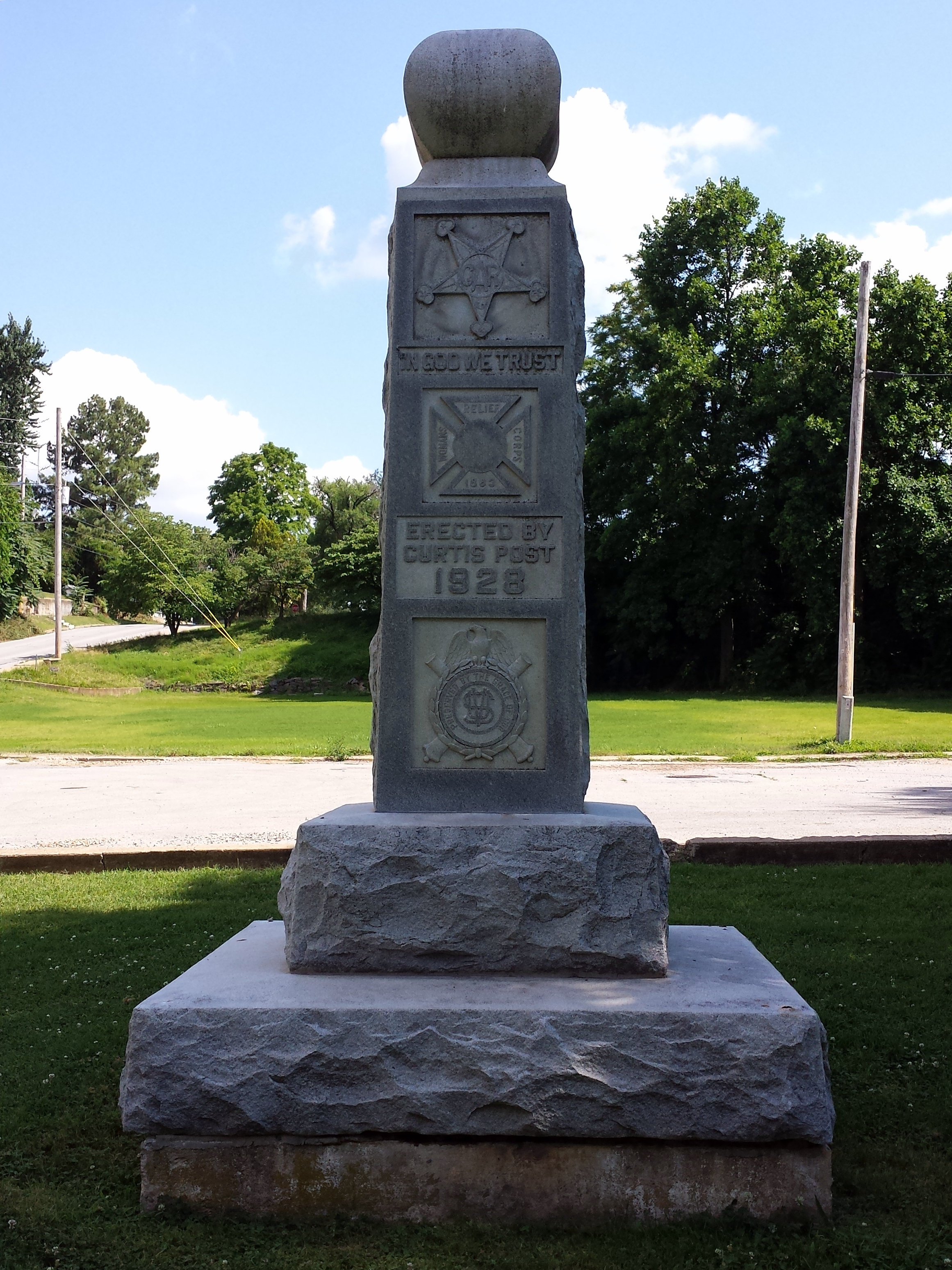
Grand Army of the Republic Memorial (Siloam Springs, Arkansas) engraved with the words "IN GOD WE TRUST"

Multiple scholars have noted that "In God We Trust" motto is one of the main elements of civil religion in the United States.

=== Religion ===
In Judaism and Christianity, the official motto "In God We Trust" is not found verbatim in any verses from the Bible, but the phrase is translated in similar terms in Psalm 91:2, (Note: Quotes provided according to the King James Version) in the Old Testament ("I will say of the LORD, He is my refuge and my fortress: my God; in him will I trust") and in the New Testament in 2 Corinthians 1:10 ("Who delivered us from so great a death, and doth deliver: in whom we trust that he will yet deliver us.") The concept is paraphrased in Psalm 118:8, Psalm 40:3, Psalm 73:28, and Proverbs 29:25. According to Philip Jenkins, a historian of religion, some Bible translations rendered Psalm 56:11 as "In God I trust; I will not fear", which could lead to substitution of the first "I" for "we".

In Islam the word for the concept of reliance on God is called Tawakkul; "In God We Trust" is the verbatim translation of the phrase عَلَى ٱللَّهِ تَوَكَّلْنَا that appears in two places of the Quran, in surah Yunus (10:85), as well as surah Al-A'raf (7:89), and several other verses reinforce this concept. Melkote Ramaswamy, a Hindu American scholar, writes that the presence of the phrase "In God We Trust" on American currency is a reminder that "there is God everywhere, whether we are conscious or not."

=== License plates ===
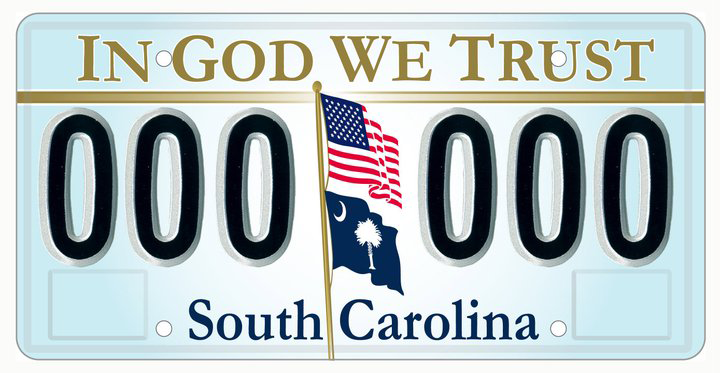
"In God We Trust" optional license plate of South Carolina, designed in 2002

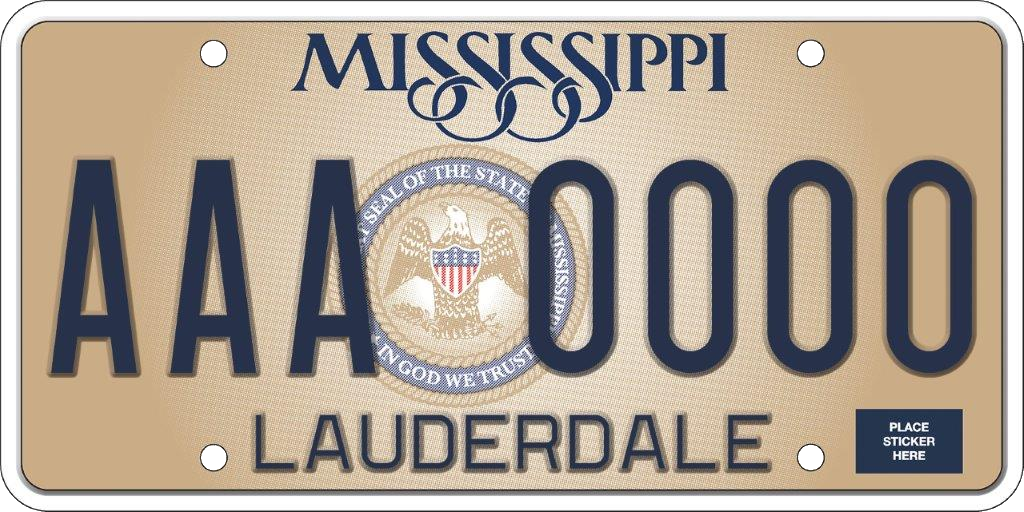
Mississippi former standard plate design, approved in 2019. "IN GOD WE TRUST" can be seen at the bottom of the state seal.

As of May 25, 2021, the following U.S. states currently offer an "In God We Trust" license plate (vanity and standard issues): Alaska, Arizona, Arkansas, Colorado, Florida, Georgia, Indiana, Kansas, Kentucky, Louisiana, North Carolina, Ohio, Oklahoma, Pennsylvania, South Carolina, Tennessee, Texas, Utah, Virginia, West Virginia, and Wisconsin.

Among the states that use the motto in standard issues, the Mississippi's standard plate will feature the motto as displayed on its state seal until the end of 2023, when it will change to the design that does not contain the motto. Utah offers a standard option license plate with a seal. Florida, which also offers a specialty plate, has an option to place "In God We Trust" instead of the official state nickname or county name; Georgia also provides for such an option, while North Carolina offers an option with North Carolina's state motto and "In God We Trust" instead of "First in Flight" or "First in Freedom". In Tennessee, the 2022 issue license plates have two versions: with and without the national motto. As of March 2023, about 60% of the state's license tags feature "In God We Trust", but this falls to 21% in Davidson County, which includes the state capital, Nashville.

=== Opinion polls ===
According to a 2003 joint poll by USA Today, CNN, and Gallup, 90% of Americans support the inscription "In God We Trust" on U.S. coins. MSNBC launched a similar live survey online that ran for several years in the late 2000s and yielded overwhelming opposition to the removal of the motto. Additionally, a 2024 poll by RealClearPolitics found that only 17% of Americans want "In God We Trust" removed from currency. However, a student poll in 2019 by College Pulse made for The College Fix showed that just over a half of students supports inclusion of the national motto in currency, with two-thirds of those who recognised themselves as Democrats opposing and 94% of Republicans in favor of the measure.

== Controversy ==
"In God We Trust" has long been controversial as an official motto due to what opponents perceive as being a religious statement, and as such, violating the separation of church and state. Secular and atheist organizations, such as Americans United for Separation of Church and State, Freedom From Religion Foundation, as well as The Satanic Temple members, have all opposed inclusion of such motto. On the other hand, Project Blitz as well as other conservative organizations and lawmakers have lobbied for its further adoption.

Proponents have extensively argued for inclusion of the national motto in more settings, grounding it in the traditional invocations of God that they say have now become an element of a civil religion and should express the will of the founders, who believed in God. Opponents, on the other hand, argue that not only does the motto violate the secular character of the United States, but it also predefines the type and number of gods (if any) to be trusted.

=== Litigation ===
The constitutionality of the phrase "In God We Trust" has been repeatedly upheld according to the judicial interpretation of accommodationism, whose adherents state that this entrenched practice has not historically presented any constitutional difficulty, is not coercive, and does not prefer one religious denomination over another. In Zorach v. Clauson (1952), the Supreme Court also wrote that the nation's "institutions presuppose a Supreme Being" and that government recognition of God does not constitute the establishment of a state church as the U.S. constitution's authors intended to prohibit. The courts also rely on the notion of "ceremonial deism" (often as defined in Brennan's dissent in Lynch v. Donnelly, 1984), i.e. that there exist religious references that, through their repetitious and customary usage, have become secular and are thus constitutional. While opponents of such rulings argue that Jefferson's notion of a "wall of separation between church and state" prohibits any aid, direct or indirect, to any religious institution, and therefore any ruling to the contrary goes counter to Founders' intent, this separationist view has not gained significant ground in judicial settings.

Even though not directly related to the motto, Engel v. Vitale (1962) elicited much speculation on the future of "In God We Trust" in public settings. In the ruling, the U.S. Supreme Court struck down a New York law that encouraged public schools to recite a prayer as written in state law on First Amendment grounds. The ruling sparked widespread outrage and was extremely unpopular at the time, even as the judges' decision was near-unanimous. Almost 4/5 of Americans disapproved of the ruling, according to a Gallup poll. Congressmen were afraid that "In God We Trust" would have to disappear from coins and banknotes, the feeling shared by the then president of the American Bar Association, John C. Salterfield. Senator Sam Ervin, a Democrat from North Carolina, went so far as to wonder if God was declared unconstitutional by that decision. Congressmen tried to direct federal funds to buy Bibles for the Supreme Court justices and to propose a constitutional amendment allowing school prayer (both measures failed). A similar ruling the following year in Abington Township v. Schempp prompted senators to attempt to force the Supreme Court to hang the national motto in the courtroom, which also did not succeed.

Even though the Supreme Court has never ruled directly on the constitutionality of "In God We Trust", several appellate federal courts and some state courts have, and the Supreme Court itself did not seem to have any problem with the phrase being inscribed on coins and banknotes.

Aronow v. United States (1970) was the first case to challenge the inclusion of "In God We Trust" on U.S. currency. The challenged statute ("the inscription 'In God we Trust'...shall appear on all United States currency and coins", 31 U.S.C. § 324a) stood, and the Ninth Circuit stated that "its [motto's] use is of patriotic or ceremonial character and bears no true resemblance to a governmental sponsorship of a religious exercise". In O'Hair v. Blumenthal (1978), the U.S. District Court for the Western District of Texas also upheld the law. The Fifth Circuit sustained the ruling in 1979 and found that the "primary purpose of the slogan was secular". The same decision was reached in Gaylor v. United States (1996) when it was appealed to the Tenth Circuit and in Doe v. United States (2018) in the Eighth Circuit.

Michael Newdow then launched a series of lawsuits attempting to outlaw "In God We Trust", with support of the Freedom From Religion Foundation. Newdow was known for his previous case Elk Grove Unified School District v. Newdow (2004), in which the Ninth Circuit issued a ruling removing "under God" from the Pledge of Allegiance (the ruling was overturned by the U.S. Supreme Court). A federal judge in California rejected his reasoning in a June 2006 ruling, as did the Ninth Circuit. The appellate court wrote that the national motto is of a "patriotic or ceremonial character", has "no theological or ritualistic impact", and does not constitute "governmental sponsorship of a religious exercise". A lawsuit filed by Newdow and Freedom from Religion Foundation in 2013 in New York also failed, both on trial and on appeal to the Second Circuit; yet another one, filed in Ohio in 2016, was dismissed by the U.S. District Court for the Northern District of Ohio and the Sixth Circuit. He also lost the lawsuit in Doe v. United States (2018). The Supreme Court denied certiorari on the Ninth and the Eighth Circuit lawsuits.

In 2015, David F. Bauman, a New Jersey state judge, dismissed a case against the Matawan-Aberdeen Regional School District brought by a student of the district and the American Humanist Association that argued that the phrase "under God" in the Pledge of Allegiance created a climate of discrimination because it promoted religion, making non-believers "second-class citizens". Bauman noted that "as a matter of historical tradition, the words 'under God' can no more be expunged from the national consciousness than the words 'In God We Trust' from every coin in the land, than the words 'so help me God' from every presidential oath since 1789, or than the prayer that has opened every congressional session of legislative business since 1787."

Additionally, several courts have agreed that "In God We Trust" on public buildings did not violate the Establishment Clause: the New Hampshire Supreme Court (1967) and the Fourth Circuit (2005) did so for public schools, and the same appellate federal court argued the same for a county government office (2005).

Even though efforts to remove "In God We Trust" in most settings were largely fruitless, mandatory display of mottos in general on license plates drew some skepticism from the judiciary. In Wooley v. Maynard (1977), the Supreme Court struck down a New Hampshire law mandating that every person carry the state motto on their license plates. The Supreme Court noted in the case that the state can't force its citizens to "use their private property as a 'mobile billboard' for the State's ideological message". Applying Wooley in Griggs v. Graham (2023), a federal judge in Mississippi ruled that under the Free Speech Clause, the state may not force individuals to display "In God We Trust" as it appears on the state seal on their license plates (see above). The judge suggested that objectors to the statement may deface the part of the license tag containing it even though a Mississippi statute may arguably punish this behavior, but declined to order the state to issue religiously neutral license plates free of charge. In an unrelated development while the ruling was on appeal, Mississippi announced the winner of a design contest for the new standard plate, which did not include the motto. Atheist plaintiffs were satisfied and dropped the lawsuit in May that year.

The Supreme Court never decided a case challenging the constitutionality of "In God we Trust" as a national/state motto on the merits. But in obiter dicta, the majority of the Supreme Court in Wooley indicated they would reject the line of argument that the plaintiffs used in that case to declare the presence of the national motto on currency unconstitutional. They argued that unlike license plates, currency was not something that was either associated directly with the owner or made to display.

== Usage in other countries ==
The Spanish equivalent of "In God We Trust", En Dios Confiamos, is an unofficial motto of the Republic of Nicaragua. The phrase can be seen on most of Nicaragua's coins. In 2023, Shas, a Haredi religious political party in Israel, proposed a bill that would order inclusion of "In God we trust" motto on banknotes, but it died in the Knesset.

Additionally, the phrase has been used in heraldic settings. In 1860, the phrase was included in the coat of arms of New Westminster, British Columbia, and it stayed there ever since. Until 1997 (though still traditionally remembered), the official heraldic motto of Brighton, England was the Latin equivalent of the phrase: In Deo Fidemus.

== See also ==
- In other countries:
  - Deus seja louvado (Brazil)
  - Dieu et mon droit (UK)
  - God, Honour, Fatherland (Poland)
  - "God Save the King" (UK)
  - God zij met ons (Netherlands)
  - Gott mit uns (Prussia, previously in Germany)
- In God We Trust: All Others Pay Cash
- List of Florida state symbols
- May God have mercy upon your soul
- National symbols of the United States
- Pledge of Allegiance of the United States, "under God" added in 1954
- Religion in the United States
- So help me God
- Trust in God and keep your powder dry
