= Pledge Protection Act =

Proposed U.S. legislation

The Pledge Protection Act is proposed legislation in the United States Congress that seeks to deprive all Federal courts, including the Supreme Court, of jurisdiction to hear constitutional challenges to the Pledge of Allegiance or its recitation. The bill was first introduced in response to a constitutional challenge to the Pledge by atheist Michael Newdow.

== Newdow v. Elk Grove ==
On June 21, 2000, the United States District Court for the Eastern District of California ruled the Pledge of Allegiance constitutional in the case of Newdow v. Elk Grove Unified School District. Michael Newdow, a prominent atheist who filed suit on behalf of his daughter, promised to appeal to the Ninth Circuit Court of Appeals.

The first decision of the Ninth Circuit was handed down on June 26, 2002, declaring that the words "under God" in the Pledge of Allegiance violated the Establishment Clause. The 'Pledge Protection Act' would be introduced into the House of Representatives for the first time on July 8, 2002, as part of the 107th Congress. Had the bill been successfully enacted into law, the decision of the Ninth Circuit would have stood, and the inclusion of "under God" in the Pledge remained unconstitutional. The law would have proscribed further appeal to the Supreme Court, but under the Ex post facto clause of the Constitution and the doctrine of the separation of powers, the law could not vacate or modify any decisions already handed down.

An attempt to challenge Newdow's standing to sue on his daughter's behalf failed in the Ninth Circuit and would be the question that would result in the entire lawsuit being vacated by the United States Supreme Court on June 14, 2004. The bill would be reintroduced again in May 2003, but no action on it would take place until September 2004, which was after the Supreme Court's ruling vacating the lawsuit.

== Legislative history ==
The bill was first introduced into the 107th Congress. Each time it has been introduced, it has always been by Rep. Todd Akin. Despite twice seeing success in the House of Representatives, it has never passed the Senate to be signed into law.

=== 107th Congress ===
The 'Pledge Protection Act of 2002' was introduced into the 107th Congress as H.R. 5064 on July 8, 2002, by Rep. Todd Akin. It was referred to the House Subcommittee on the Constitution where it died. The legislation would have added a restriction on the original jurisdiction of the United States district courts:

No court established by Act of Congress shall have jurisdiction to hear or determine any claim that the recitation of the Pledge of Allegiance, as set forth in section 4 of title 4, violates the first article of amendment to the Constitution of the United States.

=== 108th Congress ===
The 'Pledge Protection Act of 2003' was introduced into the 108th Congress as H.R. 2028 on May 8, 2003. The text of the legislation expanded upon that introduced in the 107th Congress to not only restrict the original jurisdiction of the district courts, but also strip appellate jurisdiction from the Supreme Court:

No court created by Act of Congress shall have any jurisdiction, and the Supreme Court shall have no appellate jurisdiction, to hear or decide any question pertaining to the interpretation of, or the validity under the Constitution of, the Pledge of Allegiance, as defined in section 4 of title 4, or its recitation.

The bill also called for this limitation to not apply to the Superior Court or Court of Appeals in the District of Columbia.

Originally referred to the House Judiciary Committee, it passed the committee and was referred to the floor on September 21, 2004, by a vote of 17 to 10. The bill passed the House of Representatives on September 23, 2004, by a vote of 247 to 173. The bill was passed on to the Senate on September 27, 2004, where no action on the bill would be taken.

=== 109th Congress ===
Going on the progress made by the bill in the 109th Congress, Rep. Akin reintroduced the bill as the 'Pledge Protection Act of 2005' on May 17, 2005, as H.R. 2389. The text of the legislation was identical to that introduced in the 108th Congress with only minor formatting and organization changes.

The bill tied in committee by a 15 to 15 vote on June 28, 2006. In response Rep. Phil Gingrey introduced House Resolution 920 on July 18, 2006, to provide for the bill to be considered on the floor. The resolution was adopted the next day by a vote of 257 to 168. After floor debate, the bill passed the House of Representatives by a vote of 260 to 167 the same day.

In the Senate the bill was introduced by Sen. Jon Kyl as S. 1046 on May 17, 2005. It was referred to the Senate Judiciary Committee where no action was taken.

=== 110th Congress ===
The 'Pledge Protection Act of 2007' was introduced into the 110th Congress as H.R. 699 on January 29, 2007. It was referred to the House Subcommittee on the Constitution, Civil Rights, and Civil Liberties, where no action was taken. The bill had the same text as that introduced in the 109th Congress.

=== After the 110th Congress ===
The bill has yet to be introduced again following the 110th Congress. Todd Akin did not seek re-election to the House in 2012, instead choosing to challenge Senator Claire McCaskill on her re-election bid, where he was unsuccessful. Jon Kyl retired at the end of his Senate term in 2012.

== Criticisms ==
Marci Hamilton, writing on the legal site FindLaw, stated that the bill was an attempt to "deprive the federal courts of jurisdiction to check Congress's wayward ways -- in an arena where Congress was specifically believed by the Framers to be dangerous."

The American Civil Liberties Union wrote a letter to Congress dated June 6, 2006, stating:

An effort to deny the federal courts, particularly the U.S. Supreme Court, of jurisdiction over the very sort of claim they were established to hear–governmental conduct that violates a constitutional right–is an extreme attack on the role of federal courts in our system of checks and balances. It strikes at the very intent of the Founders.

Americans United for Separation of Church and State stated on their web site that the bill "undercuts the separation of powers between the different branches of government and limits the legal options of religious minorities."

Vikram Amar and Alan Brownstein, also writing for FindLaw, stated that under the bill "the time-honored principle that children may not be compelled to recite the Pledge, established over 50 years ago in West Virginia v. Barnette, would be unenforceable in federal court." They are pointing out that if a State were to pass a law requiring the recitation of the Pledge of Allegiance, under the bill if it were passed into law, even challenging those laws in Federal courts would not be permissible. They further draw attention to the question of the constitutionality of the bill:

If a federal court thinks that it violates the Establishment Clause to include the words "one nation under god" in a publicly recited pledge, then that court would probably also think it violates the Establishment Clause for Congress to deprive federal courts of the power to hear cases precisely in order to permit the Pledge to be illegally recited.

Mark J. Pelavin, Associate Director of the Religious Action Center of Reform Judaism, objected to court stripping in regards to the Pledge of Allegiance:

Today's House adoption of the so-called 'Pledge Protection Act' is a shameful effort to strip our federal courts of their ability to uphold the rights of all Americans. By removing the jurisdiction of federal courts, including the Supreme Court, from cases involving the Pledge, this legislation sets a dangerous precedent: threatening religious liberty, compromising the vital system of checks and balances upon which our government was founded, and granting Congress the authority to strip the courts' jurisdiction on any issue it wishes. Today, the issue was the Pledge of Allegiance, but tomorrow it could be reproductive rights, civil rights, or any other fundamental concern.

== See also ==
- Jurisdiction stripping
