= Aronow v. United States =

Legal case

- Court: United States Court of Appeals for the Ninth Circuit
- Full case name: Stefan Ray Aronow v. United States of America et al
- Decided: October 6, 1970
- Citation: 432 F.2d 242 (9th Cir. 1970)

Court membership
- Judges sitting: Judges Ben C. Duniway, James Marshall Carter and District Judge Bruce R. Thompson

Case opinions
- Decision by: Thompson

Keywords
- Establishment Clause; In God We Trust

Aronow v. United States (1970) was a case heard by the United States Court of Appeals for the Ninth Circuit challenging the inclusion of "In God We Trust" on U.S. currency. The lawsuit alleged that a law passed by Congress (Pub. L. 84–140) requiring that "the inscription 'In God we Trust'... shall appear on all United States currency and coins" was a violation of the Establishment Clause of the First Amendment to the United States Constitution.

== Background ==
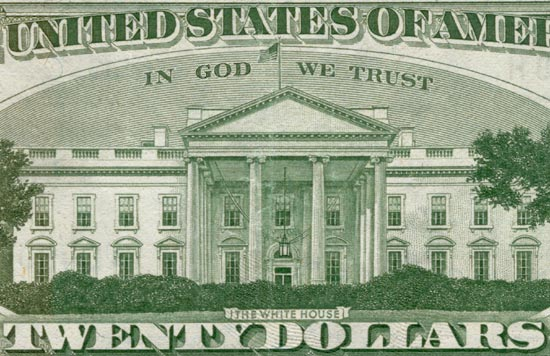
"In God We Trust" on the back of a twenty-dollar bill.

In 1970, Stefan Ray Aronow having been found without standing to sue by the District Court, appealed his case to the United States Court of Appeals for the Ninth Circuit challenging "the use of expressions of trust in God by the United States Government on its coinage, currency, official documents and publications. Specifically, the action challenged the constitutionality as repugnant to the Establishment Clause of the First Amendment of two federal statutes."

The Appeals Court, following the precedent of Massachusetts v. Mellon, agreed with the District Court that the plaintiff did not have standing as "a taxpayer and citizen", but set aside the question of standing to rule on the merits of the case.

The Court ruled:

It is quite obvious that the national motto and the slogan on coinage and currency 'In God We Trust' has nothing whatsoever to do with the establishment of religion. Its use is of patriotic or ceremonial character and bears no true resemblance to a governmental sponsorship of a religious exercise. ...It is not easy to discern any religious significance attendant the payment of a bill with coin or currency on which has been imprinted 'In God We Trust' or the study of a government publication or document bearing that slogan. In fact, such secular uses of the motto was viewed as sacrilegious and irreverent by President Theodore Roosevelt. Yet Congress has directed such uses. While 'ceremonial' and 'patriotic' may not be particularly apt words to describe the category of the national motto, it is excluded from First Amendment significance because the motto has no theological or ritualistic impact. As stated by the Congressional report, it has 'spiritual and psychological value' and 'inspirational quality.'

The Court cited Engel v. Vitale which held

There is of course nothing in the decision reached here [banning government led prayer in public schools] that is inconsistent with the fact that school children and others are officially encouraged to express love for our country by...Such patriotic or ceremonial occasions bear no true resemblance to the unquestioned religious exercise that the State of New York has sponsored in this instance.

The Court held the practice was constitutional using the reasoning established in McGowan v. Maryland. The Court maintained that the national motto has no purpose in a coercive power to aid religion - neither on the face of the legislation nor in its operative effect (its practical impact on society).

The Court also cited the Supreme Court of the United States' decision of Walz v. Tax Commission, quoting

The course of constitutional neutrality in this area cannot be an absolutely straight line...The general principle deducible from the First Amendment and all that has been said by the Court is this: that we will not tolerate either governmentally established religion or governmental interference with religion. Short of those expressly proscribed governmental acts there is room for play in the joints productive of a benevolent neutrality which will permit religious exercise to exist without sponsorship and without interference. ...Adherence to the policy of neutrality that derives from an accommodation of the Establishment and Free Exercise Clauses has prevented the kind of involvement that would tip the balance toward government control of churches or governmental restraint on religious practice.

== Subsequent history ==
The Supreme Court declined to hear an appeal of the case.

A similar decision was reached by the Fifth Circuit in Madalyn Murray O'Hair vs W. Michael Blumenthal in 1979, which affirmed that the "primary purpose of the slogan was secular."
