= Religious symbol =

Icon representing a particular religion

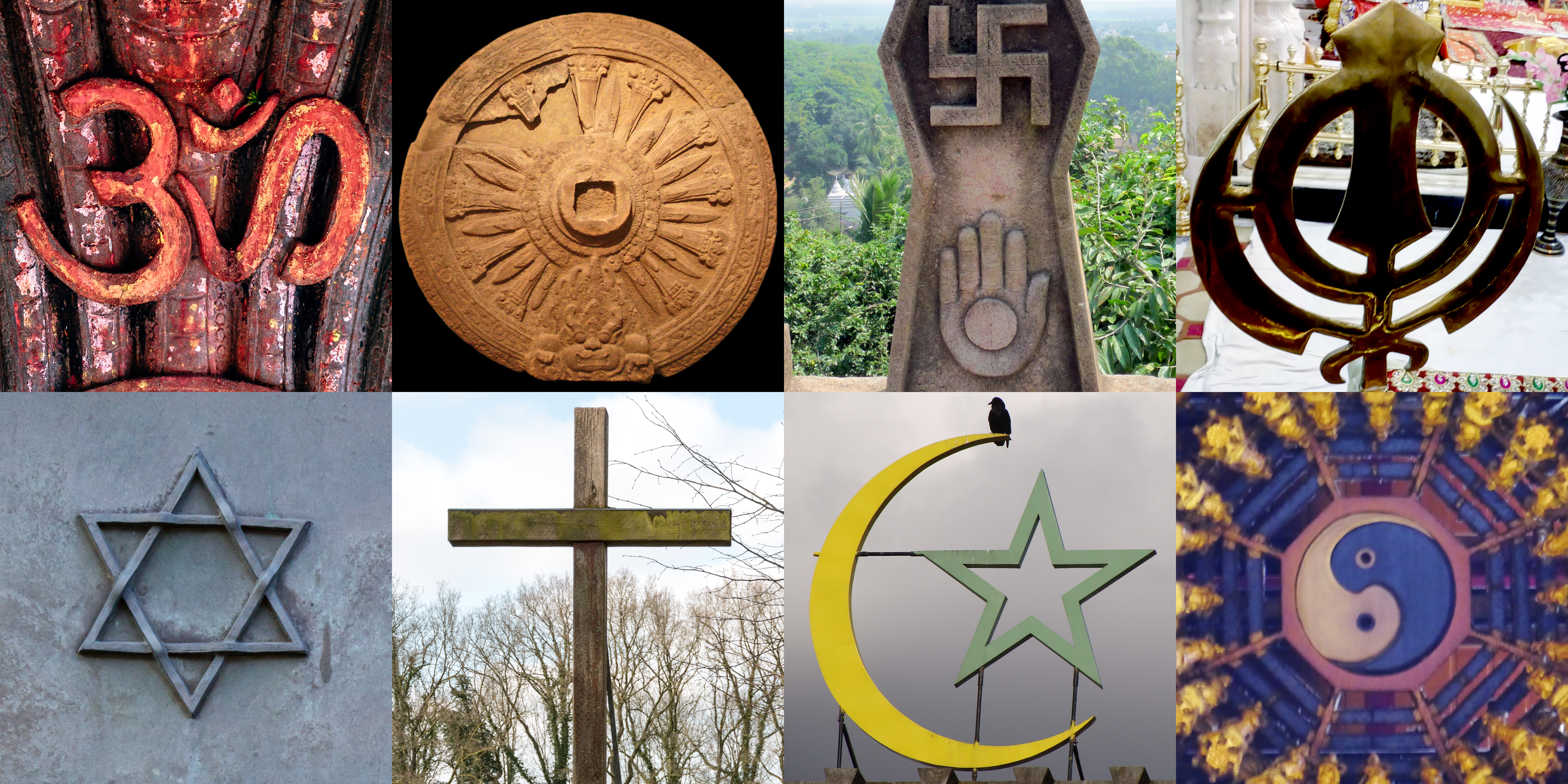
A collage of artistic representations of various religious symbols; clockwise from top left: Om for Hinduism, Dharmachakra for Buddhism, Jain Prateek Chihna for Jainism, Khanda for Sikhism, Star of David for Judaism, Latin Cross for Christianity, Star and Crescent for Islam and Taijitu for Daoism.

A religious symbol is an iconic representation intended to represent a specific religion, or a specific concept within a given religion.

Religious symbols have been used in the military in many countries, such as the United States military chaplain symbols. Similarly, the United States Department of Veterans Affairs emblems for headstones and markers recognize 57 symbols (including a number of symbols expressing non-religiosity).

== Symbols representing a specific religion ==
Symbolic representation of a specific religious tradition is useful in a society with religious pluralism, as was the case in the Roman Empire, and again in modern multiculturalism.

Religion	Name of Religious symbol	Religious symbol	Origin	Notes and references
Christianity	Cross and Cruciform		32 AD	The Christian cross has traditionally been a symbol representing Christianity or Christendom as a whole, and is the best-known symbol of Christianity. The Christian cross was in use from the time of early Christianity, but it remained less prominent than competing symbols (Ichthys, Staurogram, Alpha and Omega, Christogram, Labarum, etc.) until the medieval Crusades. Early Christianity had use for such symbols due to the persecution of Christians in the Roman Empire, as the symbol allowed inconspicuous identification of one Christian to another.
Christianity	Ichthys		2nd Century AD	At first, the sign of Christianity was the image of a fish. Fish in Old Greek - ἰχθύς ("ichthys (ichthus)"), corresponds to the abbreviation of the Christian postulate "Ἰησοῦς Χριστός, Θεοῦ Υἱός, Σωτήρ" (ΙΧΘΥΣ) - "Jesus Christ, God's Son, Savior".
Islam	Star and crescent		1900s	The star and crescent symbol was used as the flag of the Ottoman Empire from 1844. It was only gradually associated with Islam, in particular due to its ubiquitous use in the decorations of Ottoman mosques in the late 19th century. It was only occasionally adopted as an emblem of Islamic organisations, such as the All-India Muslim League in 1940 (later becoming the Flag of Pakistan), and the US American Nation of Islam in the 1970s.
Islam	Islamic calligraphy			The strong tradition of aniconism in Islam prevented the development of symbols for the religion until recently (other than single-coloured flags, see Green in Islam, Black Standard). The lack of a symbol representing Islam as a religion paired with the desire to come up with national flags for the newly formed Islamist states of the 1970s led to the adoption of written text expressing core concepts in such flags: the shahada in the flag of Saudi Arabia (1973). The Flag of Iraq (2008) and the Flag of Iran (1979) has the takbir.
Buddhism	Wheel of Dharma			The Wheel has been used as a symbol for the concept of Dharma since at least the 3rd century BC. It represents Gautama Buddha's teaching of the path to Nirvana. It is incorporated in the emblems of Buddhist organizations in India, Sri Lanka and Mongolia. It has been defined as representing Buddhism as a religious tradition as one of the United States military chaplain symbols in 1990. However, in most countries where Mahayana Buddhism is prevalent such as China, Taiwan, Korea and Japan, the Swastika is traditionally used as the symbol of Buddhism instead of the Dharma Wheel.
Baháʼí	Nine-pointed star			According to the Abjad system of Isopsephy, the word Bahá' has a numerical equivalence of 9, and thus there is frequent use of the number 9 in Baháʼí symbols. It was recognized as a grave marker by the United States Department of Veterans Affairs in 2005.
Dievturība	Krustu krusts			Krustu krusts, known as cross crosslet in English, a sigil used in Latvia for more than 1000 years, is the religious symbol of Dievturība, the ethnic religion of the Latvians since 1925.
Druidism	Triskelion			As a Celtic symbol, it is used by various eclectic or syncretic traditions such as Neopaganism.
Druze	Druze star			The Druze strictly avoid iconography, but use five colors ("Five Limits") on their Druze star and Druze flag as a religious symbol: green, red, yellow, blue, and white. Each color pertains to a metaphysical power called ḥadd, literally "a limit", as in the distinctions that separate humans from animals, or the powers that make human the animalistic body. Each ḥadd is color-coded in the following manner: Green for ʻAql "the Universal Mind/Intelligence/Nous", Red for Nafs "the Universal Soul/Anima mundi", Yellow for Kalima "the Word/Logos", Blue for Sabiq "the Potentiality/Cause/Precedent", and White for Tali "the Future/Effect/Immanence".
The Church of Jesus Christ of Latter-day Saints	Angel Moroni		1844	The Angel Moroni is an important figure in the theology of the Latter Day Saint movement, and is featured prominently in Mormon architecture and art. An angel with trumpet motif was first used as the weather vane for the 1844 Nauvoo Temple, and starting with the 1892 Salt Lake Temple, most LDS temples feature an Angel Moroni statue, including the rebuilt 2002 Nauvoo Illinois Temple. As of April 4, 2020 Russell M. Nelson, the president of the Church of Jesus Christ of Latter-day Saints, changed the symbol to an image that is a representation of the "Christus" statue at its center, placed within a rectangular cornerstone with the Church's name above it.
Community of Christ	A child with the lamb and lion		1874	The lamb and lion have been used informally in Community of Christ since the Latter Day Saints' "Kirtland" period. Its original formal iteration, prominently featuring the lion, the lamb, and child, along with the motto Peace, was designed by Joseph Smith III, Jason W. Briggs, and Elijah Banta, and approved in the denomination's General Conference in 1874.
Hinduism	Om			The syllable "om" or "aum" is first described as all-encompassing mystical entity in the Upanishads. Hindus believe that as creation began, the divine, all-encompassing consciousness took the form of the first and original vibration manifesting as sound Om. Before creation began there was shunyākāsha, the emptiness, or the void. The vibration of Om symbolises the manifestation of God in form (sāguna brahman). Om is the reflection of the absolute reality, it is said to be "Adi Anadi", without beginning or the end and embracing all that exists. The mantra Om is the name of God, the vibration of the Supreme. When taken letter by letter, A-U-M represents the divine energy (shakti) united in its three elementary aspects: Brahma Shakti (creation), Vishnu Shakti (preservation) and Shiva Shakti (liberation, and/or destruction).
Jainism	Jain emblem		1974	An emblem representing Jainism was introduced in 1974. The hand with a wheel on the palm symbolises Ahimsa.
Javanism	Chakra Bhuwana			Chakra (meaning "wheel, circle") is psychic-energy centers, an Bhuwana (meaning "earth, universe"). Since prehistoric times the tribes of the Indonesian Archipelago often revered earth and nature spirits as a life giving mother, a female deity of nature. Chakra Bhuwana is form representing an earth, centers of earth, and four mountain. in Javanism: earth is the mother and sky is the father.
Javanism	Hyang			The Javanism Calligraphy Hyang is an unseen spiritual entity that has supernatural power in ancient Indonesian mythology. This spirit can be either divine or ancestral. The reverence for this spiritual entity can be found in Sunda Wiwitan, Kejawen, and Balinese Hinduism. In the modern Indonesian this term tends to be associated with gods, devata, or God.
Judaism	Star of David		17th century CE	Jewish flags featuring hexagrams alongside other devices appear from as early as the 14th or 15th century CE. Use of the Star of David as representing the Jewish community is first recorded in Vienna in the 17th century CE.
Judaism	Menorah		4th century CE	The Menorah, originally a symbol from the Temple in Jerusalem, became a symbol of Jewish communities after the destruction and exile. Eventually it was overtaken in popularity by the Star of David, but is still used to this day.
Kemetism	Eye of Horus			A symbol from Ancient Egyptian religion symbolizing protection, royal power, and good health, as well as the god Horus.
Kemetism	Ankh			A symbol from Ancient Egyptian religion symbolizing life
Mithraic mysteries	Tauroctony		2nd century CE	Mithraism is notable for its extensive use of graphical symbols, mostly associated with astrological interpretations. The central symbol is the scene of Mithras slaying the bull; Mithras could also be symbolized in simplified form by representing a Phrygian cap.
Norse polytheism	Mjölnir		9th century CE	During the gradual Christianization of Scandinavia, from roughly 900 to 1100 CE, there was a fashion of wearing Thor's Hammer pendants, apparently in imitation of the Cross pendants worn by Christians. These pendants have been revived since the 1970s in Germanic Neopaganism.
Pythagoreanism	Tetractys		6th century BCE	The tetractys is a triangular figure of four rows adding up to the number ten, which ancient Pythagoreans regarded as the "perfect number". Pythagoras himself was credited with having devised the tetractys and it was regarded as being of utmost holiness. Iamblichus, in his Life of Pythagoras, states that the tetractys was "so admirable, and so divinised by those who understood [it]," that Pythagoras's students would swear oaths by it.
Ravidassia	Nishaan		1940s	
Roman imperial cult	Radiant crown		2nd century CE	Long used as symbol for Sun gods, the crown became the symbol of the divine status of the Roman Emperor, identified with Sol Invictus, around the 2nd century CE. The concept gave rise to the royal crowns familiar throughout the European Middle Ages.
Satanism	Sigil of Baphomet		1960s	The Sigil of Baphomet is the official insignium of LaVeyan Satanism and the Church of Satan. The Sigil was derived from an older symbol that appeared in the 1897 book "La Clef de la Magie Noire". This symbol was for a time used by the Church of Satan during its formative years. During the writing of The Satanic Bible, it was decided that a unique version of the symbol should be rendered to be identified exclusively with the Church of Satan. The complete graphic now known as the Sigil of Baphomet, named such for the first time in Anton LaVey's The Satanic Rituals, first appeared on the cover of The Satanic Mass LP in 1968 and later on the cover of The Satanic Bible in 1969. The symbol is copyrighted by the Church.
Shinto	Torii			A traditional Japanese gate most commonly found at the entrance of or within a Shinto shrine, where it symbolically marks the transition from the profane to sacred; two uprights and two crossbars denoting the separation. Their first appearance in Japan can be reliably pinpointed to at least the mid-Heian period. However, the idea of having a single Shinto symbol is foreign to most Japanese people. Only non-Shintoist Westerners perceive Torii as a symbol of the religion, possibly as a result of analogizing the relationships between Torii and Shinto from that of the Cross and Christianity. Generally speaking, Japanese people associated with Shinto do not treat Torii as a religious symbol, but rather as a gate that symbolizes the entrance to a sacred realm. However, the symbol can be used to indicate the location of Shinto shrines in Japanese maps.
Sikhism	Khanda		1920	A graphical representation of the Sikh slogan Deg Tegh Fateh (1765), adopted by the Shiromani Gurdwara Parbandhak Committee in 1920.
Taoism	Taijitu		1800s	The modern "yin and yang symbol" develops into its current shape in the 17th century, based on earlier (Song era) diagrams. It is occasionally used as representing Taoism in Western literature by the late 19th century.
Thelema	Unicursal hexagram		1904	In Aleister Crowley's Thelema, the hexagram is usually depicted with a five-petalled flower in the centre which symbolizes a pentacle. The symbol itself is the equivalent of the ancient Egyptian Ankh, or the Rosicrucian's Rosy Cross; which represents the microcosmic forces (the pentacle, representation of the pentagram with five elements, the Pentagrammaton, YHSVH or Yahshuah) interweave with the macro-cosmic forces (the hexagram, the representation of the planetary or heavenly cosmic forces, the divine).
Unitarian Universalism	Flaming chalice		1960s	Originates as a logo drawn for the Unitarian Universalist Service Committee in 1940; adapted to represent Unitarian Universalism in 1962; recognized by the US Department for Veteran Affairs in 2006.
Various, including Buddhism, Hinduism, and Jainism	Swastika			Swastika comes from Sanskrit (Devanagari: स्वस्तिक), and denotes "conducive to well being or auspicious". In Hinduism, the clockwise symbol is called swastika symbolizing surya (sun), prosperity, and good luck, while the counterclockwise symbol is called sauvastika symbolizing night or tantric aspects of Kali. In Jainism, a swastika is the symbol for Suparshvanatha – the 7th of 24 Tirthankaras (spiritual teachers and saviours), while in Buddhism it symbolizes the auspicious footprints of the Buddha.
Wicca	Pentacle		1960	The pentacle or pentagram has a long history as a symbol used in alchemy and western occultism; it was adopted as a symbol in Wicca in c. the 1960s. There was a campaign to recognize it as a symbol representing Wicca as a religion on US veteran headstones since the late 1990s, and the symbol was recognized for use on such headstones in 2007.
Zoroastrianism	Faravahar			The symbol is currently thought to represent a Fravashi (approximately a guardian angel). It is regarded as a national icon in Iran, as well as a symbol among Zoroastrians. There are various interpretations of what the faravahar symbolizes, and there is no universal consensus except to note that it does not represent the fravashi. It symbolizes good thoughts, good words, and good deeds - the basic tenets and principles of Zoroastrianism.

== Religious symbolism ==
=== African Indigenous religions ===
In some African Indigenous religions, there are graphical and pictorial symbols representing the actual religion or faith just like the Abrahamic faith. Each indigenous religion however, has symbolisms which are religious or spiritual in nature. Some of these may be graphical, numerological (as in Serer numerology - see Serer creation myth) or a combination of both. However, these graphical images represent the actual religion practice and elements within the faith. The Ìṣẹ̀ṣe religion of the yoruba people indigenous religion as an example has it graphical and pictorial symbol representing the religion, the symbol explained the philosophical concept of the four cardinal point of the earth.

The very nature of African art stem from "their themes of symbolism, functionalism and utilitarianism" hence why African art is multi-functional. In the African Indigenous belief system, Africans draw from their various artistic traditions as sources of inspiration.

Traditional African religions	Name	Symbol	Notes and references
Akan religion Main article: Adinkra symbols	Gye Nyame		The Adinkra symbol representing the omnipotence, omniscience, omnipresence, and immortality of Nyame (the Akan sky god).
Serer religion (a ƭat Roog)	Yoonir		Yoonir is a religious symbolism in the traditional faith of the Serer people. It symbolizes the universe as well as the Serer people. In the Serer worldview, it represents good fortune and destiny and was used by Serer illiterates to sign their names. The peak of the star represents the Deity Roog. The other four points represent the cardinal points of the Universe. The crossing of the lines pinpoints the axis of the Universe, that all energies pass. The top point is "the point of departure and conclusion, the origin and the end".
Serer religion (a ƭat Roog)	Mbot		The mbot is the symbol of the Ndut rite of passage (a circumcision rite) that every Serer male must go through. The female equivalent is Ndom (the tattooing of the gums). It is in Ndut classical teachings where Serer boys get to learn about themselves, the importance of teamwork, good citizenship and the secrets and mysteries of the universe.
Ìṣẹ̀ṣe Religion	Ìṣẹ̀ṣe	Isese Religion	The Symbol of Ìṣẹ̀ṣe - Yorùbá indigenous Religion explained the Philosophical concept of the Four Cardinal Points (Igun Mẹ́rin Ayé) and its cosmological meanings as it was arranged and explained by Ọ̀rúnmìlà Baraà mi Àgbọnnìrègún through IFÁ - the esoteric language of OLÓDÙMARÈ, and which is the Centrality of the Existence of Humanity, Divinity, and the Cosmos.: Iwájú Ọpọ́n; Ẹ̀yìn Ọpọ́n; Olùmú Ọ̀tún; Olùkànràn Òsì; Àárín Ọpọ́n Ìta Ọ̀run

=== Other examples of religious symbolism ===
- Ayyavazhi symbolism
- Baháʼí symbols
- Buddhist symbolism
- Christian symbolism
- Jewish symbolism
- Symbolism in The Church of Jesus Christ of Latter-day Saints
- Symbols of Islam

== See also ==
- Allegory
- Religious and political symbols in Unicode
- French law on secularity and conspicuous religious symbols in schools
- Religion in national symbols
- Sigil
- Religious symbolism in the United States military
- Religious symbols in classrooms
- Religious symbols in public offices

== Bibliography ==
- Baer, Hans A. (1998). William H. Swatos Jr (ed.). "Symbols", in Encyclopedia of Religion and Society. Walnut Creek, CA, USA: Hartford Seminary, AltaMira Press. p. 504. ISBN 0761989560. Archived from the original on 21 September 2008.
- Boyce, Mary (2001). "Fravaši". Encyclopedia Iranica. Vol. 10. Costa Mesa: Mazda. pp. 195–199.
- Gilmore, Peter H. (2001). "Baphomet [Sigil of Baphomet]". In James R. Lewis (ed.). Satanism Today. Santa Barbara, California: ABC-CLIO. pp. 20–21. ISBN 9781576072929.
