= Secular education =

System of public education in countries with a secular government

Secular education is a system of public education in countries with a secular government or separation between religion and state.

== History ==
Secular educational systems were a modern development intended to replace religious ecclesiastical and rabbinic schools (like the heder) in Western Europe. Secular schools were to function as a cultural foundation to diffuse the values of a human culture that was a product of man's own faculty for reason.

This contrasted against religious education which placed value on tradition - knowledge that was "revealed" - instead of the "human values through which manifested the uniqueness of the human being in nature as a creature who is himself a creator, a being who shapes his environment and who fashions himself within that environment". For Jews the ideal was the Maskil, the Jewish equivalent of Enlightenment philosophers or humanists.

== Actions and controversies ==
=== Banning of religious symbols ===
In the French public educational system conspicuous religious symbols have been banned in schools.

While some religious groups are hostile to secularism and see such measures as promoting atheism, other citizens claim that the display of any religious symbol constitutes an infringement of the separation of church and state and a discrimination against atheist, agnostic and non-religious people.

=== Other ===
- In Turkey the promotion of Imam Hatip Islamic schools by the government following the March 2012 education reform bill, allegedly alarmed some Turkish citizens. The Education Reform Bill was written without public debate or even discussion in the Ministry of National Education's own consultative body; it did not even figure in the government’s 2011 election manifesto. Besides undermining Turkish secularism, the new measures would undermine educational standards and deepen social inequalities, according to education specialists. Turkey’s leading universities, including Sabancı University, Boğaziçi University, Middle East Technical University and Koç University, all issued press statements describing the reforms of 2012 as hastily conceived, retrograde and out of step with current thinking.
- In Italy the Lautsi v. Italy case was brought before the European Court of Human Rights regarding the display of crucifixes in classrooms of state schools.
- In Romania the CNCD Decision 323/2006 was brought to the CNCD by Emil Moise, a teacher and parent from Buzău County, regarding the public display of Orthodox icons in classrooms and was supported by some high-profile activists.
- In 2009 a new body was formed, the Australian Secular Lobby, to promote secular education in Australia.
- In Southern Thailand, the secular educational system is being undermined by insurgent groups by means of the destruction of schools and the assassination of teachers.

== See also ==
- French law on secularity and conspicuous religious symbols in schools
- Humanum Genus
- Ligue de l'enseignement
- Secularism in France
