= Soile =

Soile is a Finnish female given name.

== Notable people ==
- Soile Isokoski, singer
- Soile Lautsi, who brought the case Laustsi v. Italy
