= Deus seja louvado =

Motto

The phrase on a twenty reais bill.

"Deus seja louvado" (In English, "God be praised") is an expression displayed in the left bottom part of all Brazilian real currency banknotes. It exists since the 1980 decade, when the then President of the Republic, José Sarney, openly Catholic, asked the Banco Central (Central Bank) to include the phrase in the cruzado coin. The Federal Government at the time got inspired by theist doctrines of other secular states such as the United States of America that were already using the motto "In God We Trust" in its dollar banknotes.

The first banknotes with the inscription were printed on February 24, 1986, when the executive order was presented to the Central Bank. This way, the expression remained throughout time, including real banknotes. Despite recent discussions and requests by secularist sectors of civil society for the phrase to be removed, it continues to be printed by the Central Bank, including new banknotes, printed since 2010. Faced with attempts to remove the phrase on the banknotes by the Public Ministry, José Sarney stated: "I feel sorry for the man who does not believe in God on the face of the earth".

== Controversies ==
=== Criticism ===
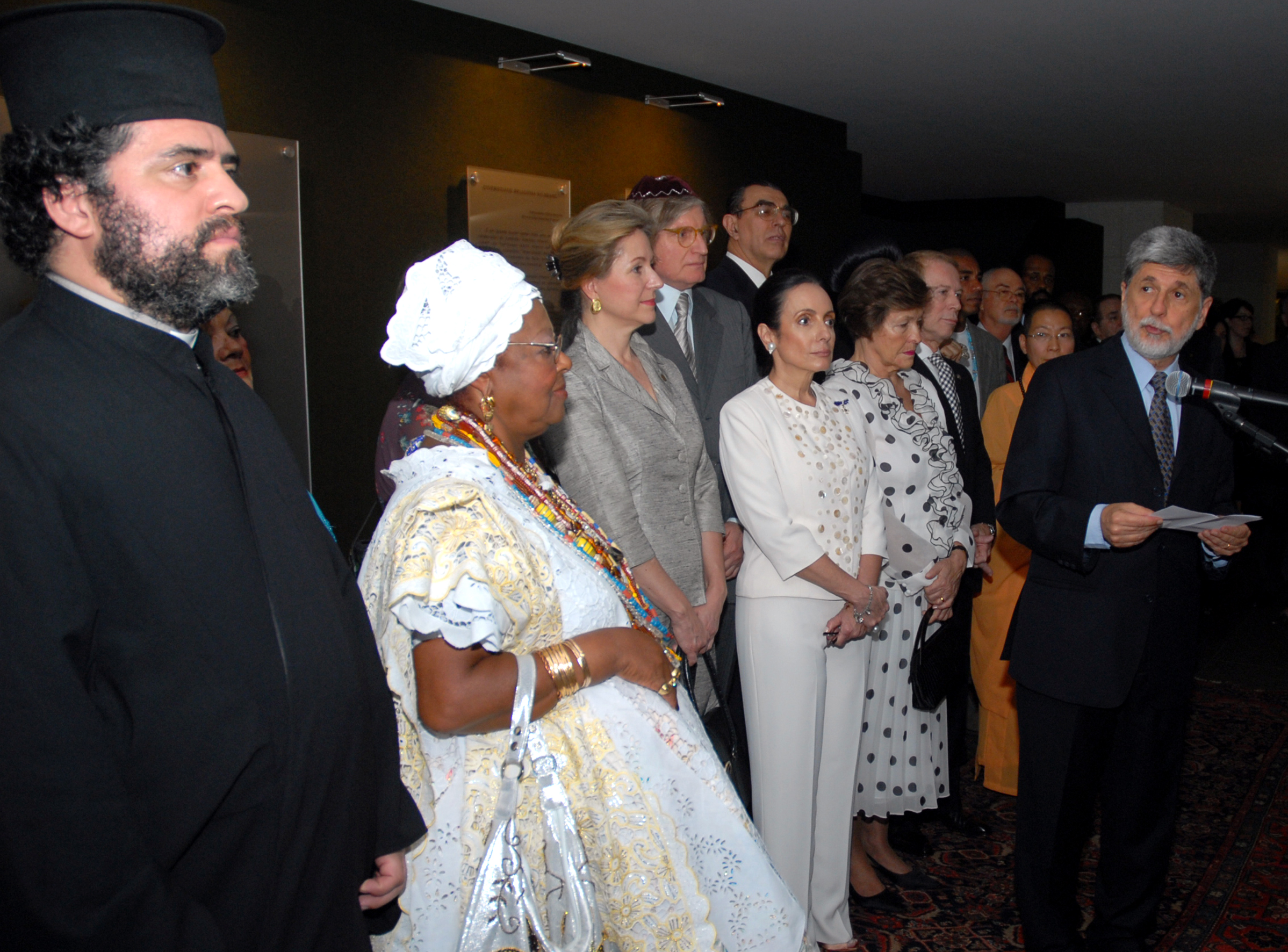
According to secularists, the religious diversity in Brazil is not represented by a phrase which privileges only monotheistic religions. In the image, the ex-Minister of Foreign Affairs, Celso Amorim, in a meeting with adherents of different religions of the country

The phrase "God be praised" creates arguments because, according to some, it would be contrary to the secular state, which does not privilege any religion, although there is no consensus on the part of the religious communities, especially the Christian ones. To many people, the phrase would not take into account the existence of non-theistic communities such as agnostics, Buddhists and atheists, as well as adherents of other non-monotheistic religions, such as Hinduism and Afro-Brazilian religions, but the population is in its vast majority adept of Christianity, which does not imply popular dissatisfaction due to the phrase in the coin.

=== Attempts of removal ===
In December 2010, the Federal Public Ministry in São Paulo notified the Central Bank to offer an answer on behalf of an "offense to the secularism of the Federative Republic of Brazil", suing the Central Bank for keeping the term "God be praised" in real banknotes. On November 12, 2012, the Regional Attorney's Office for Citizens' Rights asked the Federal Court to order the removal of the expression "God be praised" from the national currency banknotes, so as not to privilege any religion since the state is secular. The lawsuit was filed by Catholic prosecutor Jefferson Aparecido Dias.

According to Dias, the measure "would not cause expenses to the public finances, since a period of 120 days would be given so that the Casa da Moeda (Brazilian mint) begins to print the new notes without the phrase". He also said that no law authorizes the inclusion of religious expressions in money. In addition, he said that the purpose of the lawsuit is to safeguard the right of religious freedom of all citizens. "Let's imagine the real note with the following expressions: Allah be praised, Buddha be praised, Save Oxossi, Save Lord Ganesha, God does not exist. There would certainly be agitation in Brazilian society because of the embarrassment suffered by citizens believers in God," says an excerpt from the Attorney's complaint.

Christian and political leaders came out with strong criticisms of the representation. Pastor Silas Malafaia said in a video posted on his website that the prosecutor is the same person who accepted and filed a homophobia complaint against him: "I'm suspicious that this prosecutor has nothing to do. I think the Attorney General has to get a job for this citizen". Malafaia also recalled that the Constitution is presented as being elaborated "under the protection of God", and that the prosecutor should also propose the change of the name of states such as Santa Catarina ("St. Catherine"), São Paulo ("St. Paul") and Espírito Santo ("Holy Spirit"), in addition to national Catholic holidays.

The secretary-general of the National Conference of Bishops of Brazil (CNBB), which is part of the Catholic Church hierarchy, Archbishop Leonardo Ulrich Steiner, said: "We should be concerned about much more essential things. Many people will only notice the phrase after this lawsuit. This type of lawsuit is not new! The phrase will now recall the presence of God in the life of the Brazilian people". For Dom Leonardo, the expression "does not embarrass, but it can annoy those who say they do not believe". "People who live their faith, in their various expressions, certainly do not feel embarrassed, for they live on the greatness of transcendence. It's that faith is not at first worshipping a god, but relationship. If the phrase reminds of a relationship, it could be remembered that money itself must be at the service of people, especially the poor, in sharing and in solidarity. If so, God be praised!" says the bishop.

=== Court's decision ===
On November 30, 2012, the Federal Court denied the Federal Public Prosecutor's request to enforce the Federal Government and the Central Bank to remove, in up to 120 days, the phrase of Brazilian real notes. In three pages of the decision, it is reported that the Public Ministry did not provide evidence that there was "opposition to the statements inscribed on the banknote within the social sphere". The judge pointed out that the Federal Public Ministry in São Paulo did not listen to secular or religious institutions of other denominations demonstrating opposition to the presence of the phrase in the banknotes.

The court decision said that "the citation of God in the notes does not seem to be a targeting of the state in the life of an individual that forces him to adopt or not a certain belief". The preliminary decision was subsequently sustained. In 2013 Federal Judge Diana Brunstein, of the Civil Court of São Paulo, denied the request made by the Federal Public Ministry to remove the expression "God be praised" from the real banknotes. The same judge had already denied a preliminary injunction in November 2012. The Union Attorney's office argued that the expression "God be praised" in real notes does not repel the secularism of the state. "(...) The Brazilian state does not disavows the faith. On the contrary, it supports the religious value when it facilitates the practice of acts of faith professed by the population and adopts religious holidays (...)".

== See also ==
- In God We Trust
- God Save the Queen
- Gott mit uns
- May God have mercy upon your soul
- So help me God
- Religious symbols in public offices
