= Asztalos =

Asztalos is a Hungarian-language occupational surname literally meaning "carpenter". Notable people with this surname include:

- Csaba Ferenc Asztalos
- Dávid Asztalos
- Lajos Asztalos
