= Secular Homeschooling =

American magazine

- Secular Homeschooling's first cover (Fall 2007)
- Editor: Deborah Markus
- Frequency: Bimonthly
- First issue: Fall 2007
- Final issue: 2011
- Country: USA
- Language: English

Secular Homeschooling was an American magazine for people who homeschool for reasons other than religion. It began as a quarterly, but became a bimonthly in July 2009. The magazine is no longer published and the final issue was released in 2011.

Because the magazine was written (and, presumably read) by people who consider religious belief a personal matter rather than a prerequisite of homeschooling, it might be seen as reflecting the diversity of the homeschooling community.

As a specifically non-religious magazine, Secular Homeschooling discussed some topics differently from other homeschooling magazines. For example, one article discussed the particular difficulties of discussing and dealing with death for the non religious. In the article "The Most Difficult Subject", the author writes that death is, to religious families "less threatening as a concept, it’s also much more frequent and natural a subject of conversation and thought" because some of their religious beliefs focus on death (Jesus' death and resurrection, for example).

The magazine occasionally ran humor as well. One piece, "The Bitter Homeschooler's Wish List" – "a wish list from one homeschooler to other parents who ask annoying and inappropriate questions about the decision to homeschool" – has been described as a "legendary Internet screed". The list bitterly points out that not all homeschoolers are religious or homeschool for religious reasons, and that homeschoolers of all types tire of being criticized.

== See also ==
- Homeschooling
- Secular education
