= CNCD Decision 323/2006 =

2006 Romanian National Council for Combating Discrimination decision

CNCD Decision 323/2006 is a decision of Romania's National Council for Combating Discrimination (CNCD) regarding the display of religious symbols in public schools. The decision was brought to the CNCD by Emil Moise, a teacher and parent from Buzău County, who stated that the public display of Orthodox icons in classrooms constitutes an infringement of Romania's separation of church and state and discriminates against atheist, agnostic and non-religious people.

On November 21, 2006, the CNCD upheld Moise's complaint and ruled that the Ministry of Education, which operates public schools, must "respect the secular character of the state and the autonomy of religion" and that "religious symbols must only be shown during religion lessons or in areas dedicated exclusively to religious education". On June 11, 2008, the Romanian Înalta Curte de Casație și Justiție (High Court of Cassation and Justice) ruled that the presence of icons in schools is legal, in effect overturning the CNCD's decision.

== History ==
In 2005, Emil Moise (who affirms himself to be Christian-Orthodox) took the Buzău County School Inspectorate to court due to the presence of Romanian Orthodox icons in his daughter's school, the Margareta Sterian Art High School in Buzău. He claimed that the presence of such religious symbols in a state institution is an infringement of Romania's constitutionally-guaranteed freedom of conscience and freedom of religion. The Buzău County Court ruled on March 27, 2005 in Decision 157/2005:

The existence of religious symbols on the walls of school chancelleries, halls and classrooms does not infringe the fundamental rights of freedom of conscience, thought and the freedom of religious belief, and that of equality in student's rights, and does not represent a discriminatory situation for the plaintiff's daughter, a student at the Margareta Sterian Art High School in Buzău, who attends religion classes. It must be noted that in the case of this educational institution there exists a special situation in comparison to other schools run by the Buzău County School Inspectorate, in that the majority of icons exhibited in this institutions are elaborate works of the high school's students and are considered objects of art.

In this way, the County Court rejected Moise's complaint, upholding the maintenance of the religious symbols in the Margareta Sterian Art High School. Moise appealed to the Ploieşti Court of Appeals, which upheld the County Court's decision on July 20, 2006.

In July 2006, Moise filed a complaint at the National Council for Combating Discrimination, or CNCD, Romania's anti-discrimination and equality watchdog, claiming discrimination on the basis of religion under Romania's anti-discrimination law of 2000, and asking for the removal of religious symbols from all Romanian public education institutions.

On November 13, 2006, a number of Romanian non-governmental organisations sent a letter to the CNCD backing Moise's complaint.

On November 14, 2006, Emil Moise was interviewed at the CNCD's headquarters in Bucharest. On the same date, the Secretary of State for Religious Affairs, Adrian Lemeni, also made a submission to the CNCD, asking that the religious symbols be maintained in schools. He argued that Orthodox icons were not an object of "religious veneration", but rather a symbol of freedom, "as well as having a powerful national symbols, being considered expressions of Romania's spiritual and cultural heritage". He concluded by saying that:

We consider, in principle, that the display of religious symbols on the public walls of educational institutions does not constitute a breach of other people's rights and liberties so as to necessitate their removal, a solution which has not been adopted in any other European state with traditions similar to those of Romania.

== Decision ==
The CNCD's decision on Moise's complaint was made on November 21, 2006. On this date, the organisation disclosed a press release outlining that its decision and stating that a more complete explanation will be available in 15 days, according to law. The decision stipulated that:

the Ministry of Education must elaborate and implement an internal regulation, in a reasonable amount of time, that regulates the presence of religious symbols in institutions of public education. This internal norm must be based on the following principles:

1. It must assure the right to education and access to culture on the basis of equality;
2. It must respect the right of parents to assure their children's education based on their religious and philosophical beliefs;
3. It must respect the secular character of the state and the autonomy of religions;
4. It must assure the freedom of religion, conscience and beliefs of all children on the basis of equality;
5. Religious symbols may only be displayed during religious education classes and in areas intended exclusively for religious education.

The CNCD's president, Csaba Ferenc Asztalos, stated that "[Through this decision], we recognised the relationship between the state and religions in Romania; we haven't touched on the historical recognition of the contributions of Christianity to the formation of the Romanian people. Now we call on the state, through the Ministry of Education, to assume its responsibilities on what happens in schools in this respect".

== Response ==
The CNCD decision provoked widespread public debate on the issue of religious symbols of public schools and on the overall role of religion in Romanian society.

=== Emil Moise ===
Emil Moise lauded the CNCD's decision to uphold his complaint by claiming it was "an extraordinary result" in the separation between church and state and that "this is what the legislation for combating discrimination states". He also declared that "the Ministry of Education has a single thing to do now: to respect the CNCD's recommendation. Otherwise, I will return to court".

=== Government ===
After the CNCD's ruling, the Ministry of Education and Research responded that "due to the special character of the decisions which must be taken", it would send the ruling to the Education Commission of the Romanian Parliament for debate. After the CNCD decision was fully published, the Ministry issued a comment stating it would not implement the CNCD's decision.

=== Religious groups ===
The Patriarchate of the Romanian Orthodox Church issued a press release on November 23, 2006, criticising the CNCD decision as an attack on freedom of religion. The release stated that "the presence of religious symbols in schools is not the result of an imposition, but rather of the desire and consent of parents, teachers and students in conformity with the religious and cultural values which they share. Consequently, a decision to exclude [these symbols] would represent a brutal and unjustified measure of restraining religious liberty, contrary to European democratic principles. Such a decision would lead to the discrimination of Romanian [religious] believers".

Additionally, the spokesperson of the Orthodox Church, Constantin Stoica, declared that the issue of religious symbols in schools should be resolved by local communities and not be regulated by "neither the Church, nor the Ministry of Education, nor the CNCD". He also declared that "just as the majority must respect the rights of minorities, minorities must also respect the rights of the majority", echoing the Church's line that the CNCD decision went against Romania's Orthodox majority, which forms approximately 87% of the population according to the 2002 census.

Other religious groups also criticised the CNCD's decision. The Roman Catholic Archbishopric of Bucharest characterised the decision as "abusive and discriminatory" and going against the "sensibilities and religious freedoms of the Romanian people". The Armenian Orthodox Church in Romania compared the decision to a nihilistic stance, and stated that while "Emil Moise wishes to be a defender of the rights of atheist children ... the atheist is indifferent, neutral, on the subject of symbols of the divinity; he denies rather than combats God".

Murat Yusuf, the mufti of Romania's small Islamic community, opposed the decision and said that Romania was an example of religious tolerance and co-existence and so such a law was unnecessary. He stated that the Muslim community has lived for "more than eight centuries in these lands" and "the existence of other religious symbols in public institutions never bothered us and does not bother us now".

Speaking on behalf of the even smaller Jewish community, Aurel Vainer, who represents the Federation of Jewish Communities of Romania in Parliament, noted that "the Romanian people is in large part a Christian people" and characterised the debate as one that "serves no purpose in our country". He described the presence of icons as "a right won by Romania's Christians" and saw no hindrance to their continued display in schools.

=== Civic Media petition ===
On November 22, 2006, an online petition was started by Civic Media, a journalism NGO, with the aim of overturning the CNCD decision. The petition stated that the decision was "anti-European", "anti-religious" and "discriminatory" to Romania's Orthodox majority. It also cited court rulings in Italy and Greece which upheld the right of public schools to display Christian symbols such as crosses. The petition was signed by more than 3,000 people. Civic Media, founded in 2000, has been involved in conservative religious campaigning before, starting a similar petition in 2006 to prevent the construction of a modern shopping centre near St Joseph's Cathedral (Roman Catholic) in Bucharest.

The petition was also supported by roughly 150 organisations like Altermedia, and the Romanian Association for Heritage or the ROST Association. There were also a number of mainstream high-profile signatures: for example, the petition was signed by the writer Valentin Hossu-Longin, seven members of the Romanian Academy (Dan Berindei, Virgil Cândea, Florin Constantiniu, Augustin Buzura, Mariana Nicolesco, Dinu C. Giurescu, Constantin Bălăceanu-Stolnici), the president of the National Initiative Party, Cozmin Guşă, and the youth wing of the Christian-Democratic People's Party. Two major teachers unions (the National Education Federation and Spiru Haret Union, with almost 120,000 members) and three major media organisations endorsed the petition (MediaSind Media Union, the Romanian Journalists' Society and The Romanian Union of Professional Journalists).

Civic Media also stated that they would appeal the CNCD's decision in court.

=== Overturning of decision ===
On June 11, 2008, the High Court of Cassation and Justice ruled that the presence of icons in schools is legal, in effect overturning the CNCD's decision.

The ruling was confirmed later in a separate cause brought before the Court by another NGO, Pro-vita.

== See also ==
- Religious education in Romania
- McCollum v. Board of Education
- Lautsi v. Italy
- French law on secularity and conspicuous religious symbols in schools
