= Calendarium Naturale Magicum Perpetuum =

Calendar by Johann Baptist Grossschedel

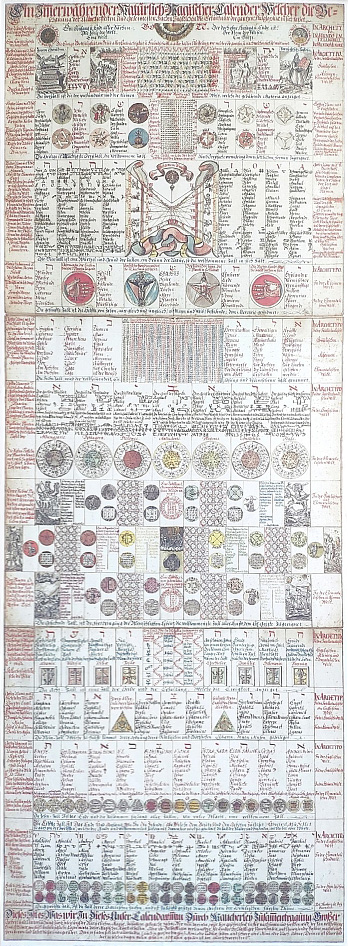
Facsimile reproduction of the Calendarium Naturale Magicum Perpetuum

The Calendarium Naturale Magicum Perpetuum is a late renaissance (c.1619-1620) grimoire and esoteric print of calendar engravings. Its full title is Magnum Grimorium sive Calendarium Naturale Magicum Perpetuum Profundissimam Rerum Secretissimarum Contemplationem Totiusque Philosophiae Cognitionem Complectens. It is in three sheets, measuring more than four feet long and about two feet wide, and includes an early example of a Pentagrammaton.

The "author" in the 1619 (or 1620) Frankfurt print is given as Johann Baptist Grossschedel von Aicha (Frankfurt 1620), and attributes some of the engravings to Tycho Brahe. The original engraver is given as Theodor de Bry (Flemish-born German engraver, 1528–98) as originally published in 1582. The 1620 engraver used by Grossschedel may be Matthäus Merian the Elder (Swiss engraver, 1593–1650). The work predated, and influenced, the Rosicrucian furor.
