= National Council for Combating Discrimination =

Romanian government agency

- Consiliul Național pentru Combaterea Discriminării

Agency overview
- Formed: 27 November 2001
- Jurisdiction: Romania
- Headquarters: Piața Valter Mărăcineanu nr. 1-3, Sector 1, Bucharest
- Website: https://www.cncd.ro/

The National Council for Combating Discrimination (Romanian: Consiliul Național pentru Combaterea Discriminării, or CNCD) is an agency of the Romanian government, established in 2001 and responsible for applying Romanian and European Union anti-discrimination laws and managing the National Anti-Discrimination Plan. The legal status of the CNCD was established by the anti-discrimination law of 2000 (Law 137/2000) and subsequently amended in 2006. According to the law, the Council reports to the parliament and is politically independent. It has often ruled against government institutions at various levels (particularly local councils).

The CNCD is based in Bucharest, its offices being located in Valter Mărăcineanu Square. It is headed by Csaba Asztalos (himself an ethnic Hungarian) and employs 49 other members of staff.

== Anti-discrimination rulings ==
An individual or other legal entity can bring forward a case of discrimination to the CNCD within one year of the case or event occurring. The CNCD is obliged, within 90 days, to investigate the case and rule on whether anti-discrimination laws were breached. The anti-discrimination law covers discrimination based on: race, nationality, ethnicity, language, religion, social category, beliefs, sex, sexual orientation, age, disability, HIV/AIDS status, and any other criteria which restrict human rights, equalities and fundamental liberties. If discrimination is proven to have occurred, the Council can issue a fine or a warning. If discrimination was directed towards an individual person, fines range between 400 and 4000 lei, while if an entity discriminated against a group of people or a community (e.g. an ethnic minority in general), fines range between 600 and 8000 lei.

Further compensation claims for discrimination are not decided by the CNCD, but rather by the court system, even though, in such cases, the CNCD's ruling plays an important role in ascertaining whether discrimination took place. The CNCD's rulings and fines can also be appealed in court.

Notable rulings of the Council include:

- In August 2004, the CNCD fined the city government of Miercurea-Ciuc 4000 lei for the forced eviction of 140 Romani people and their relocation to a hazardous area near a facility for treating wastewater. The CNCD ruled that the city government had discriminated on the basis of ethnicity.
- In February 2005, the CNCD gave a 500 lei fine to TAROM, the national airline, for denying a same-sex couple access to its Valentine's Day specials for couples. This was the first instance in which the Anti-Discrimination Law of 2000 was applied on the grounds of sexual orientation.
- In March 2005, the CNCD fined the Anunţul telefonic newspaper 500 lei for publishing an advertisement for a job placement which explicitly excluded members who were of Romani ethnicity.
- In 2005, the CNCD gave a 1000 lei fine to Ion Stanciu, an Orthodox priest, for discriminating against the leader of a church choir on the basis of sexual orientation. This was the second CNCD case involving sexual orientation, and was reported to the CNCD by Accept, Romania's largest LGBT rights organisation.
- In 2005, the CNCD fined the company Adrasim 2000 lei after it published an advertisement for a job opening which explicitly discriminated against applicants of Roma ethnicity. The site which published the advertisement, e-jobs.ro, was also fined with 400 lei.
- In 2005, the CNCD fined the City Hall of Mizil 600 lei after it published an article in its newsletter, Poştalionul, which made discriminatory remarks against Jehovah's Witnesses. However, the Mizil City Hall appealed against the CNCD decision in a local court, which overturned the fine due to a procedural flaw on behalf of the CNCD.
- In 2006, the CNCD found that religious symbols must not be displayed in public schools, aside from during religious education classes and in areas solely intended for these classes. The Decision was appealed and overturned. See the CNCD Decision 323/2006.
- In September 2007, the CNCD found that banning men who have had sex with men from donating blood constitutes discrimination on the basis of sexual orientation. It ordered the Ministry of Health to revise its ban and ruled that banning MSMs from blood donation "creates a hostile, degrading, humiliating and offensive atmosphere for homosexuals".

== Initiatives and campaigns of the CNCD ==
Aside from its legal powers in ruling against cases of discrimination and applying the law, the CNCD is also responsible for a number of initiatives and campaigns which seek to combat discrimination. Many of these initiatives are organised in collaboration with non-government organisations or members of the civil society, and include:

- The "Diversity is a Gift" campaign, organised in the city of Timișoara in May and June 2006, with the support of the Timișoara Intercultural Institute. The campaign included a number of free public seminars which discussed the origins and effects of discrimination, anti-discrimination provisions in Romania, and social means of combating discrimination.
- The CULTfest 2006 festival for cultural diversity, which was organised jointly with the Group for Social Initiatives, Studies and Analysis, GISAS and the Timișoara Intercultural Institute, on 18–20 August 2006. The festival took place in Sebeş, Alba County, and included a photographic exhibition, public debates on issues relating to cultural diversity, as well as traditional dance and musical performances of the various cultures and ethnicities which inhabit the area.
- The Racism Breaks the Game campaign, or Rasismul Strică Fotbalul, which was organised jointly with several NGOs, with the purpose of combating racism in Romanian football. The campaign was part of pan-European Week Against Racism in Football, an initiative of the Football Against Racism in Europe organisation.

CNCD also offered a grant to Accept, Romania's largest LGBT rights organisation, for GayFest 2006, Bucharest's annual gay pride festival.

== Research ==
The CNCD is also responsible for conducting research into social attitudes and perceptions regarding the phenomenon of discrimination in Romania, and regularly publishes reports on its findings. Additionally, the CNCD established a Documentation Centre (Centru de Documentare) which can be accessed by the public and which provides a series of publications relating to anti-discrimination, human rights, legislation, minority rights issues, etc.
