= Yahshuah =

Esoteric and allegorical form of the name of Jesus based on the Tetragrammaton, YHWH

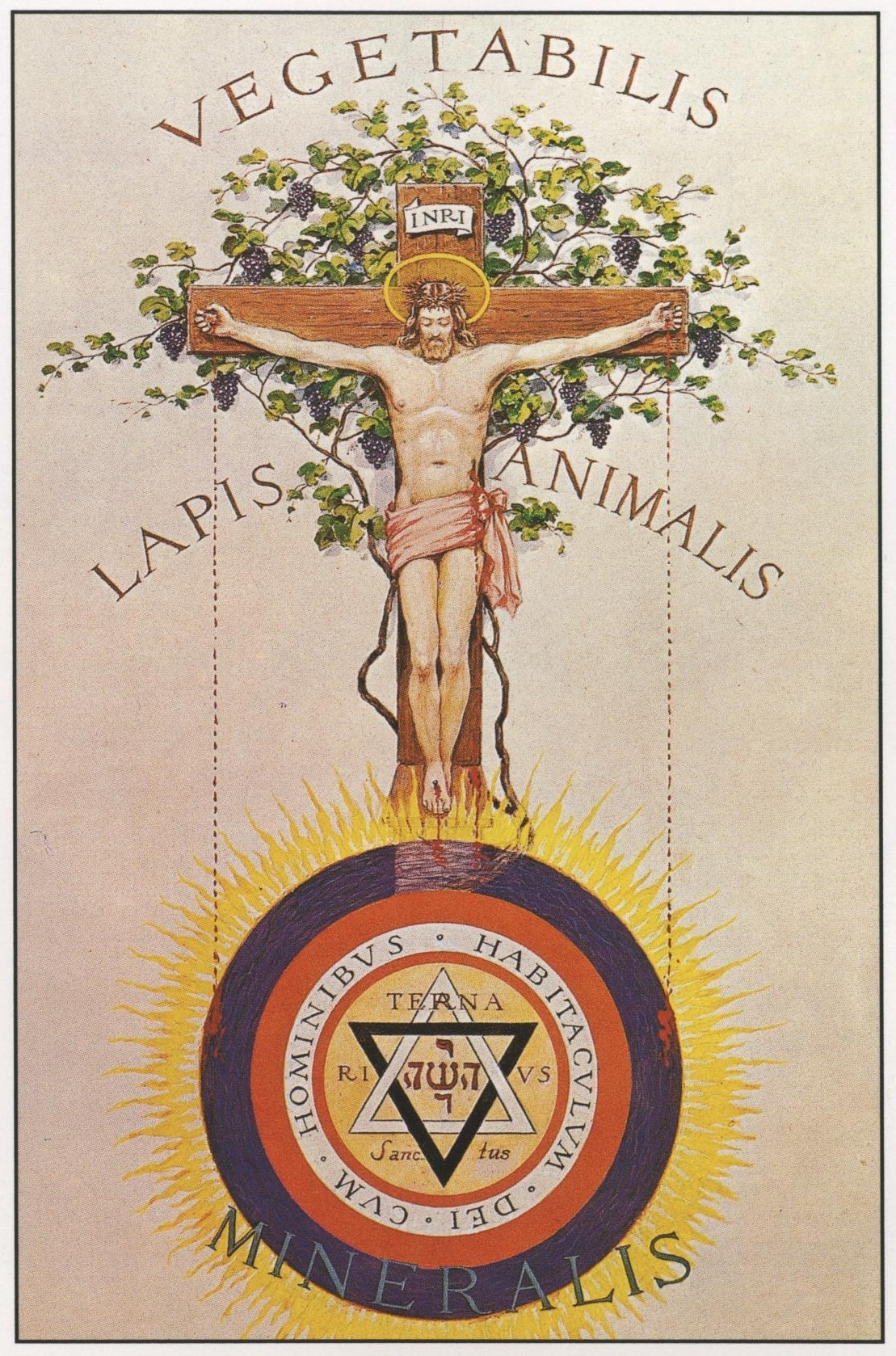
"A Rosicrucian Crucifixion" showing the five Hebrew letters of the "Pentagrammaton" in the hexagram

The pentagrammaton (Greek: πενταγράμματον) or Yahshuah (Hebrew: יהשוה) is an allegorical form of the Hebrew name of Jesus, constructed from the Biblical Hebrew form of the name, Yeshua (a Hebrew form of Joshua), but altered so as to contain the letters of the Tetragrammaton. Originally found in the works of Henry Cornelius Agrippa (1531), Athanasius Kircher, Johann Baptist Grossschedel (1619) and other late Renaissance esoteric sources.

The essential idea of the pentagrammaton is of an alphabetic consonantal framework Y-H-Sh-W-H, which can be supplied with vowels in various ways. (Also, the "W" can be converted into a "U" or "V", since the Hebrew letter ו waw writes either a [w] consonant sound—later on, pronounced [v]—or a long [u] vowel sound: see Mater Lectionis.)

== Renaissance occultism ==
Occultistic pentagram showing the five Hebrew letters of the "Pentagrammaton" from the 1897 book "La Clef de la Magie Noire" by Stanislas de Guaita.

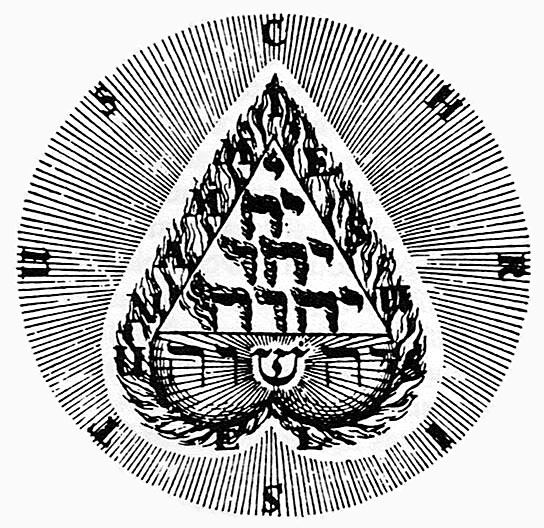
Symbol by early 17th-century mystic Jakob Böhme with names of Jesus, and a derivation of the pentagrammaton from the Tetragrammaton.

The first ones to use the name of Jesus something like "Yahshuah" were Renaissance occultists. In the second half of the 16th century, when knowledge of Biblical Hebrew first began to spread among a significant number of Christians, certain esoterically minded or occultistic circles came up with the idea of deriving the Hebrew name of Jesus by adding the Hebrew letter shin ש into the middle of the Tetragrammaton divine name yod-he-waw-he יהוה to produce the form yod-he-shin-waw-he יהשוה.

This was given a basic Latin transliteration JHSVH or IHSVH or IHSUH (since there was no letter "W" or sh / [š] sound in Latin, and "I" and "J" were then not yet clearly distinguished as letters of the alphabet, nor were "U" and "V"). This could then be supplied with further vowels for pronounceability. By coincidence, the first three letters of this consonantal transcription IHSVH, etc. were identical with the old IHS/JHS monogram of the name of Jesus (from Greek iota-eta-sigma).

In Renaissance occultist works, this pentagrammaton (or five-letter divine name) was frequently arranged around a mystic pentagram, where each of the five Hebrew letters י ה ש ו ה was placed at one of the points (the letter shin ש was always placed at the upward-pointing vertex of the pentagram). One of the earliest attested examples of this diagram is in the Calendarium Naturale Magicum Perpetuum or "Magical Calendar" (published 1620 but dated 1582) of either Theodor de Bry (Flemish-born German, 1528–1598) or Matthäus Merian the Elder (Swiss, 1593–1650). The idea of the pentagrammaton was funneled into modern occultism by 19th-century French writer Eliphas Levi and the influential late 19th-century Hermetic Order of the Golden Dawn. The Golden Dawn favored the consonantal transcription IHShVH or YHShVH, and the pronunciation Yeheshuah.

In Hebrew and Aramaic, the name "Jesus"/"Yeshua" appears as yod-shin-waw-`ayin יֵשׁוּעַ Yeshua and as the longer form of the same name, yod-he-waw-shin-`ayin יְהוֹשֻׁעַ "Joshua"/"Yehoshua". The letter `ayin ע was pronounced as a voiced pharyngeal consonant sound in ancient Hebrew and some Aramaic languages, as opposed to the pronounced [h] sound or a silent Hebrew letter he ה. It however commonly was not pronounced, especially at the end of words in various Palestinian Aramaic dialects.

== See also ==
- Christian Cabala – Christian interpretation of Kabbalah
- Esoteric Christianity – Mystical approach to Christianity
- Joshua – Central figure in the Hebrew Bible's Book of Joshua
- Magic words – Word or phrase said to cause magical events
- Names and titles of Jesus
- Tetragrammaton – Four-letter name of God in the Hebrew Bible
- Yeshua – Alternative form of the name Joshua (Yəhōšūaʿ)
