= Religious symbols in public offices =

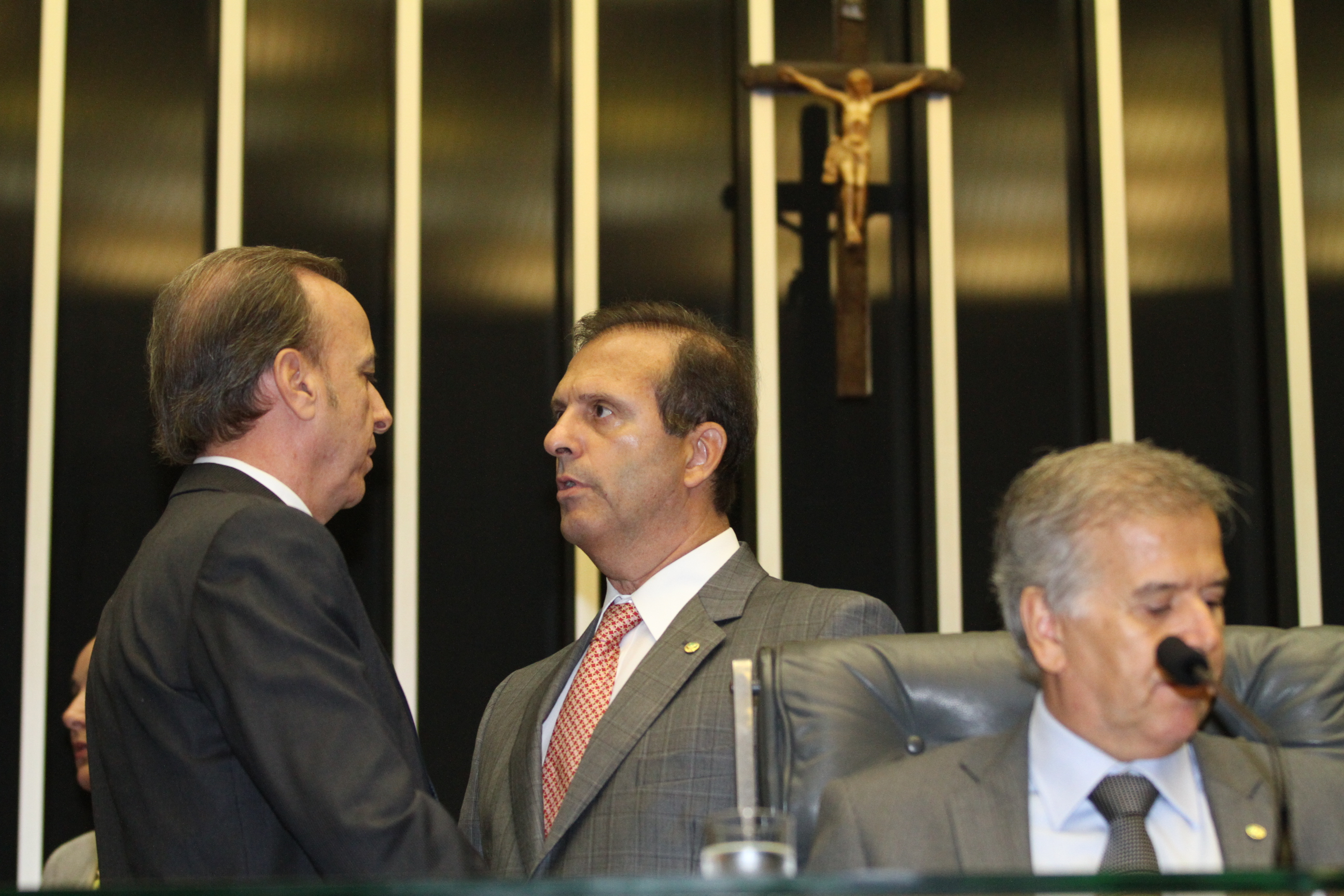
Crucifix on the wall of the plenary hall of the Chamber of Deputies of Brazil, in the National Congress Palace

The use of religious symbols in public offices generates controversy in several countries, especially the use of Catholic crucifixes in countries with a Christian majority, such as Brazil and the United States. According to secularists, the presence of these items of religious devotion contradicts the principle of secularism in secular states, ignoring the representation of religious and non-religious minorities.

== Brazil ==
In Brazil specifically, this subject has been discussed for over a century, and was addressed by Miguel Vieira Ferreira in the book O Cristo no júri (English: Christ in the jury), in which he protested against the presence of crucifixes in juries.

In the 1940s, the Popular Representation Party (1945-1962), a political party that brought together numerous Green Shirts from the ranks of the Brazilian Integralist Action (1932-1937), launched a nationwide campaign through its coreligionists, successfully proposing the enthronement of the image of the crucifix in several State Legislative Assemblies, Municipal Chambers, and the Federal Chamber, as well as in courts throughout the country.

The plural aspect and its multiplicity of meanings would serve as an inspiration to Brazilian public figures. According to Councilor Amadeu Puppi (PRP-PR), during the enthronement ceremony of the crucifix in the Municipal Chamber of Ponta Grossa, Paraná: "May this Chamber and its legislators, when raising their eyes to the Crucified, always know that they are worthy of so much knowledge and so much love, which Christ possesses and represents, for the glory of Ponta Grossa, Paraná, and Brazil."

In 2024, the Federal Public Prosecutor's Office (MPF) filed an appeal to overturn a decision by the Regional Court of the 3rd Region (TRF-3) that rejected the removal of religious symbols from public offices in the state of São Paulo. The MPF argued that Brazil was a secular country and therefore public authorities should not be tied to any specific religion. However, the TRF-3 considered that the presence of these symbols reaffirms religious freedom and respect for cultural aspects of Brazilian society.

== Portugal ==
In Portugal, this is a topic that, as a whole, has ceased to exist due to the return to secularization after the revolution of April 25, 1974. The strong anticlerical movement in Portugal dates back to the period of the establishment of the republic in 1910.

== See also ==
- Deus seja louvado
- In God We Trust
- Religious symbols in classrooms
