= May God have mercy upon your soul =

Phrase used on pronouncement of death sentence

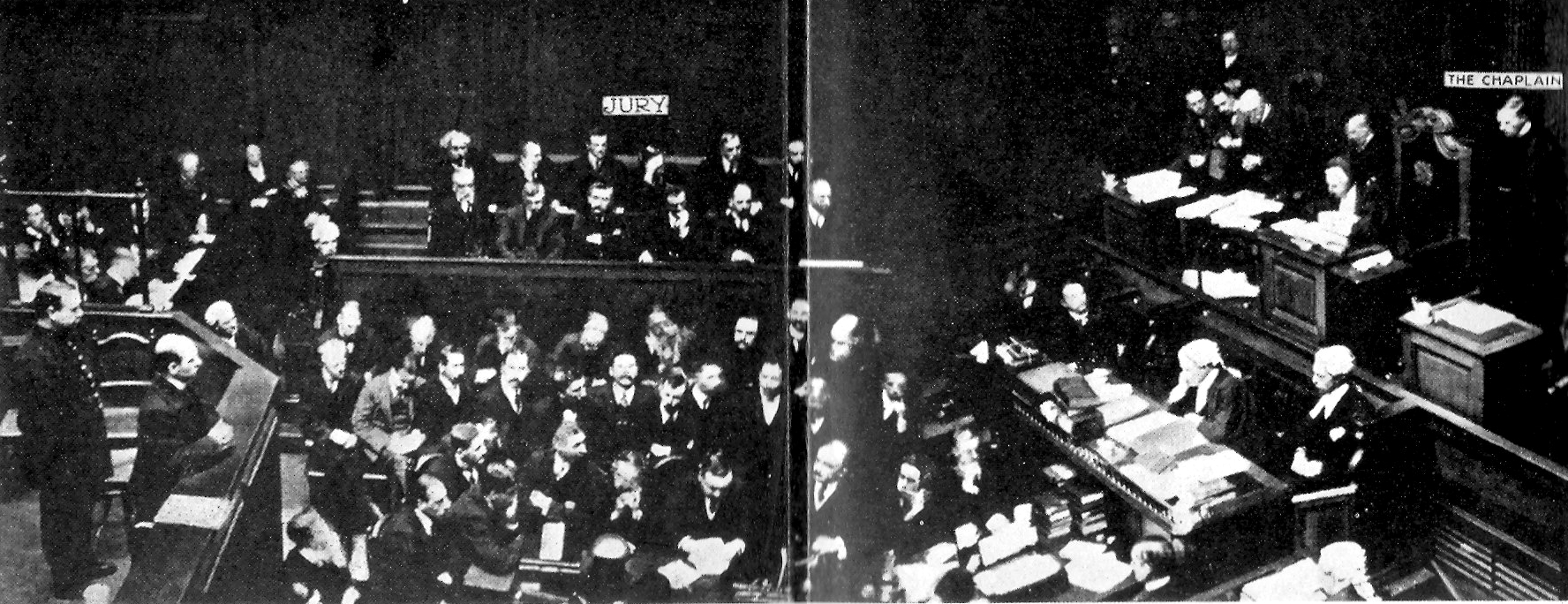
In 1912, the poisoner Frederick Seddon (leaning on the dock, left) was sentenced to death by Mr Justice Bucknill wearing a black cap (right)

"May God have mercy upon your soul" or "may God have mercy on your soul" is a phrase used within courts in various legal systems by judges pronouncing a sentence of death upon a person found guilty of a crime that carries a death sentence. The phrase originated in beth din courts in the Kingdom of Israel as a way to attribute God as the highest authority in law. The usage of the phrase later spread to England and Wales' legal system and from there to usage throughout the colonies of the British Empire whenever a death sentence was passed.

Depending on where it is used, the phrase has had different emphasis through the years. It was formally intended as a prayer for the soul of the condemned. However, in later times, particularly in the United States, it has only been said as a result of legal tradition where the religious meaning and origin is not founded on belief.

== Wording ==
The phrase is used by the presiding judge pronouncing the sentence of death after putting on a black cap and black gloves. In England, the black gloves were a deliberate contrast with the white gloves normally worn at the end of an Assize sitting, which indicated there had been no death sentence passed during the Assize. The wording of the traditional phrase has changed over time. In England, the wording in the 18th century was "and the Lord have mercy upon thy soul". This later developed into "may God have mercy upon your soul", which was used as the traditional closing sentence by judges passing the death sentence in England and Wales, Canada and Australia. The phrase is treated as a prayer and would traditionally be followed by "amen". Newspaper reports would cite the usage of the phrase as "the usual words had been said".

In the 18th century, the common wording of the phrase in England was "the law is that thou shalt return to the place whence thou camest and from thence to a place of execution where thou shalt hang by the neck till the body be dead. Dead. Dead. And the Lord have mercy upon thy soul". This phrase later developed over time until the 1940s when the phrase in Dominions of the British Empire was:

The sentence of this court is that you will be taken from here to the place from whence you came and there be kept in close confinement until [date of execution], and upon that day that you be taken to the place of execution and there hanged by the neck until you are dead. And may God have mercy upon your soul.

== History ==
The phrase is likely to have originated in the Kingdom of Israel following the Law of Moses in beth din courts as a way of giving credence to the authority of God as the author of all law. It is likely to have come from Deuteronomy 16:18 where it stated: "Judges and officers shalt thou make thee in all thy gates, which the Lord thy God giveth thee, tribe by tribe; and they shall judge the people with righteous judgment". This gave rise to the theory that judges had been given authority from God to exercise judgment on matters of the law and would use the phrase to attribute this fact to God. The phrase continued to be used in courts, passing from Jewish to Christian context as a way to continue to affirm God as the highest authority in law. Clarence Darrow, Oliver O'Donovan and the Chicago Law Journal have stated that the phrase's continual usage may have come about as a result of judges feeling that while they could pass a sentence of death upon a person, they personally did not have the authority to destroy souls and that only God had the authority to do that. As a result, some judges would cross their fingers whenever they said the phrase as a result of concern for the criminal's soul as they said it as a prayer. While the phrase is intended to be said by judges with conviction, it is also said because of legal tradition and not necessarily due to belief in its meaning. During the 17th century in the Massachusetts Bay Colony, the Puritan majority of judges at the time did not believe that stating "may God have mercy on your soul" had any meaning unless the accused had made a confession of the crime in open court. They, and other Puritan office holders, would also regularly press the condemned up until the point of execution to make a confession of the crime they had been convicted of to ensure that the phrase satisfactorily had meaning according to their views.

In the United States, following independence from Great Britain, the phrase was not commonly used. However, when the first death sentence was passed in Taos County, New Mexico, the judge used the phrase but immediately followed it with a statement that the court would not be responsible for asking "an all wise providence" to do something the jury could not do due to the American principle of separation of church and state. In the 19th century, due to American law moving away from moral judgments based on Christian principles towards the principle of a judgment that was "beyond reasonable doubt", the phrases "not having the fear of God before your eyes" and "may God have mercy upon your soul" were the very few remainders within the American court system of the British colonial morality-based trials. Despite this, "may God have mercy on your soul" has been used as a closing statement in modern times by American judges when passing a sentence of death. Sometimes as it is mandated by state law, other times as a result of legal tradition. A version of the phrase was used by a Florida judge when Aileen Wuornos was sentenced to death, the judge in this case stated "and may God have mercy on your corpse".
