= Johann Baptist Grossschedel =

Johann Baptist Großschedl von Aicha (5 February 1577 – 1630s) was a German nobleman, alchemist and esoteric author. The German "von Aicha" is a later supposition from the Latin "ab Aicha" on his publications, which may be related to Aiglsbach in Bavaria and the "Grossehedl von Perckhausen und Aiglspach" nobility, who originally came from Regensburg.

He was born 1577, according to a manuscript of his horoscope extant in the British Museum. where he is also given the title eques romanus (Roman knight) suggesting a knight of the Germanic Holy Roman Empire, or Freiherr, which suggests identification with the family of two Grossschedel brothers, "Gebrüdern Groschedel," of Regensburg, whose elevation to nobility was granted in 1623, and the family's noble status was confirmed to Franz von Großschedl by Maximilian II Emanuel, Elector of Bavaria in 1691.

Another surviving manuscript of his can be found within the Manchester Medical Manuscripts Collection held by special collections at the University of Manchester Library. The manuscript has the reference MMM/23/2/1 and contains elements of a pharmacopoeia as well as references to the role of the zodiac and the works of Paracelsus and Jean Beguin. He also uses the title eques romanus in this manuscript.

== Works ==
- Calendarium Naturale Magicum Perpetuum - claiming to incorporate calendars by Tycho Brahe
- Proteus Mercurialis Geminus, Exhibens Naturam Metallorum, Frankfurt 1629
- Trifolium Hermeticum, oder Hermetisches Kleeblat (on the hermetic cloverleaf) Frankfurt 1629
