= Religious symbols in classrooms =

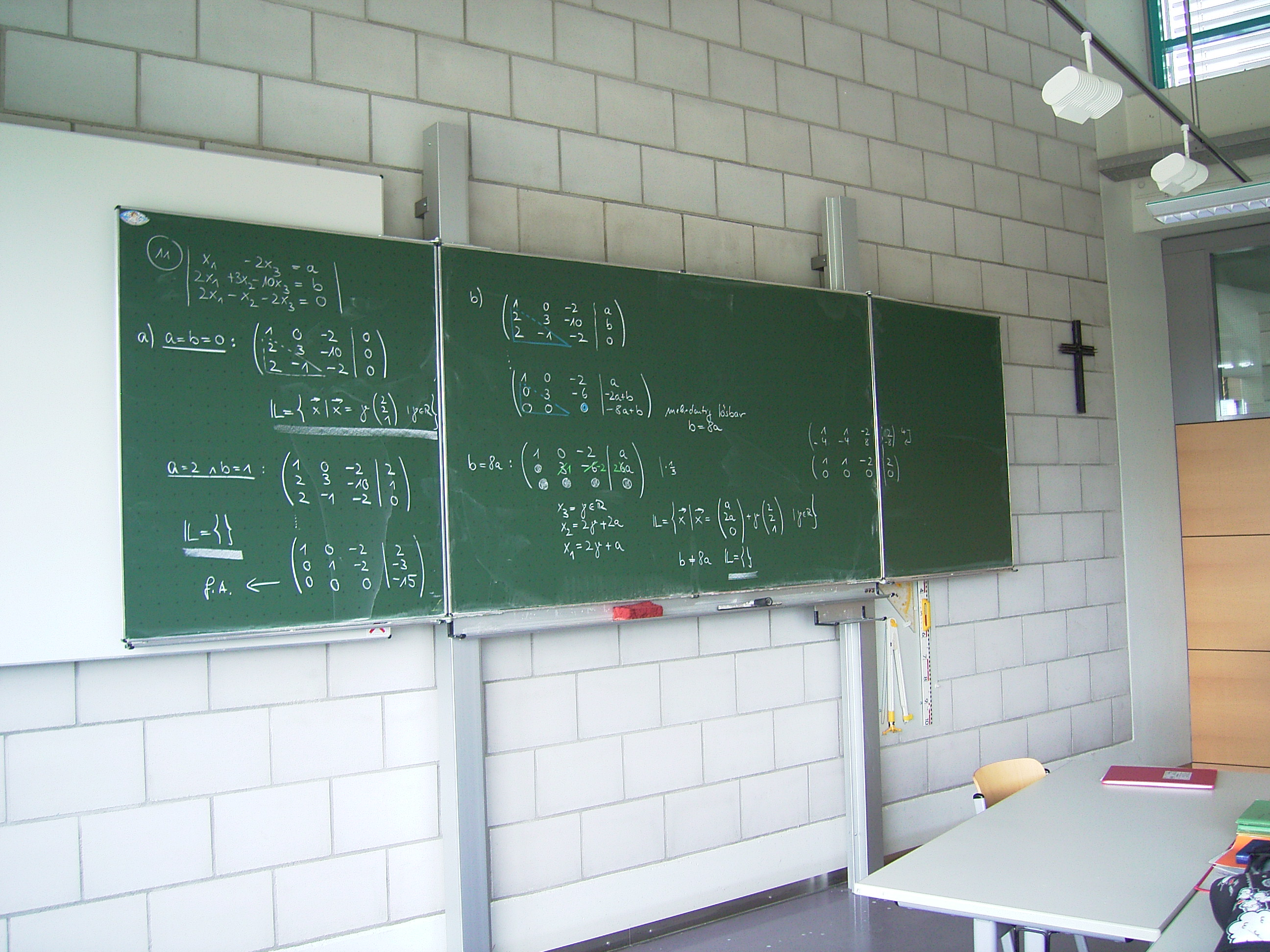
Display of a crucifix in a German classroom in Überlingen, Baden-Württemberg

The display of religious symbols in classrooms, especially crucifixes, is an old tradition in countries with a Christian majority, especially Catholic ones. This type of symbolism has raised strong protests from secular associations, non-Christian religious denominations, atheists and agnostics, often justified by legal actions, to varying degrees in different countries. However, the custom of displaying the crucifix in classrooms has essentially remained, with the exception of France, where the presence of religious symbols in public schools has been expressly prohibited by law since the beginning of the 20th century. On this subject, the European Court of Human Rights has also spoken out, which attempted to prohibit its display in 2011, but due to the controversy generated especially in Italy, it reversed its decision and considered the display of the symbol in classrooms to be correct, stating that the crucifix does express a religious meaning.

== The Americas ==
=== United States ===
The country's public school classrooms do not have a crucifix. There is only the American flag and, usually, the text of the national anthem.

== Europe ==
=== Austria ===
The presence of the crucifix is guaranteed by a law of 1949, confirmed by the Concordat of 1962 between the Austrian Government and the Holy See, in all classrooms where more than half of the students declare themselves to be Christians.

=== Belgium ===
In Belgium, the crucifix, like any other religious symbol, is prohibited in public, state and municipal schools, but is allowed in Catholic schools.

=== France ===
In France, Article 28 of the Law of 9 December 1905 expressly prohibits the display of religious symbols or emblems in monuments or public spaces, with the exception of places of worship, burial places, museums and exhibitions. A century later, the French Parliament overwhelmingly approved Law 228 of 15 March 2004, Article 1 of which establishes the prohibition, in primary and secondary schools, of the use of symbols or clothing displaying religious affiliation.

=== Germany ===
Only in Bavaria is the crucifix normally displayed in primary school classrooms, as this is a traditionally Catholic German state. However, if a student argues that it violates their freedom of religion, school authorities can initiate a conciliation procedure, which can lead to its removal. A 1995 ruling by the German Federal Constitutional Court declared the presence of religious symbols in classrooms unconstitutional. However, the Bavarian government circumvented this ruling by drafting a state law that guaranteed the presence of crucifixes. The parliamentary majority of the Christian Social Union (CSU) approved the text, which stated: "In view of the historical and cultural character of Bavaria, every classroom shall have a crucifix." The law stipulates that if a student's parents object to the presence of the cross for "serious and understandable reasons of belief and ideology", the school administration must attempt to reach an amicable agreement. If this does not happen, a mediator must resolve the dispute.

=== Greece ===
In Greece the crucifix is usually displayed in the classroom.

=== Italy ===
The display of the crucifix in Italian classrooms is regulated by two royal decrees (i.e. normative, not legislative) from 1924 and 1928, although there is no general legislation requiring its presence in public places (in the case of courts, the obligation is provided for by a ministerial circular). The regulations, however, apply only to primary and secondary schools, leaving the issue undefined for nurseries, colleges and universities. Despite the clarity of the directives, not all schools in question comply with them. In recent decades, it has also been a source of intense debate about the secular nature of the Italian state.

The objections raised to the presence of the crucifix have been based on allegations of violation of the principle of secularity of the Italian state. The civil courts, however, say that they do not have jurisdiction to decide the issue, since the Ministry's guidelines are not civil law. It is also alleged that the secular nature of the State would not be harmed by the presence of crucifixes, since they are part of the culture and history of the Italian people and do not serve as an imposition of Christianity on those present.

In 2009, there was great controversy in the country after a decision by the European Court of Human Rights (ECHR), which overturned a decision by the Italian Supreme Court to keep crucifixes in schools, following a lawsuit filed by Finnish Soile Lautsi. The ECHR ruled that the presence of crucifixes was contrary to religious freedom. The case had national repercussions with criticism from several authorities, who ordered crucifixes to be placed in all classrooms, squares, and other public places in several Italian cities. In light of the controversy, the ECHR reversed its decision, supporting the presence of religious icons, saying that they were not only a religious icon, but also a symbol of Western civilization.

=== Portugal ===
The crucifix is displayed in many classrooms in Portugal, although the State allows religious freedom, despite the Concordat that privileges the Catholic Church in several dimensions of social life. The display of crucifixes is a decision made by schools.

=== Romania ===
In Romania, decision 323/2006 of the National Council for Combating Discrimination ruled that the Ministry of Education must "respect the secular character of the State and the autonomy of religion," and that "religious symbols must be displayed only during religious instruction hours or in areas exclusively dedicated to religious education." The case arose from an appeal by Emil Moise, who claimed that the public display of Orthodox icons constituted a breach of the separation of church and state in Romania, and also that it discriminated against atheists, agnostics and irreligious people.

=== San Marino ===
In the face of the controversy between the European Court and Italy, the United Left of San Marino called for the removal of crucifixes in schools, out of respect for secularism. However, the Secretary of Education, Romeo Morri, ruled against the request. In 2005, a petition was filed to remove crucifixes from classrooms and public offices, but was later rejected.

=== Spain ===
The crucifix has been displayed in classrooms in Spain since 1930, and is still present today, even though the state is secular.

In 2009, the government led by Zapatero created a bill to remove all religious symbols from public schools. The debate had already arisen before, as in 2005 there were requests from parents for the removal of the Christian symbol.

=== Switzerland ===
In Switzerland, the municipality of Ticino decided to place the crucifix in all classrooms, but in 1990, the Federal Court ruled against the display of crucifixes, asking for their removal, arguing that "the State has the duty to guarantee the philosophical-religious neutrality of its schools, and cannot identify itself with a religion or confession. It must ensure that pupils and students do not feel offended in their religious convictions by the continued presence of the symbol of a religion to which they do not belong".

== See also ==
- Catholic Church
- Secularism
- Religious symbols in public offices
