= Csaba Ferenc Asztalos =

Romanian politician (born 1974)

Csaba Ferenc Asztalos (born February 17, 1974, in Baia Mare) is a politician of Hungarian ethnicity in Romania and an ex-member of the Democratic Alliance of Hungarians in Romania. He is, since July 2025, a judge at the Constitutional Court of Romania, appointed by the Chamber of Deputies, for a non renewable term of nine years. Before that, he was the president of the National Council for Combating Discrimination, Romania's anti-discrimination and equality body. He speaks Romanian, Hungarian and English.

== Education ==
Asztalos completed high school in Baia Mare, at the Hungarian-language section of Mihai Eminescu High School, where he specialised in philology. Between 1993 and 1997, he studied law at the University of Oradea. Later, he undertook post-graduate studies at the David Oligvy National School of Political and Administrative in Bucharest, and in 2003 was a doctoral candidate in international law at the University of Bucharest.

In 2002, he was appointed to the National Council for Combating Discrimination, and became president of the institution in 2005.

== Political activity ==
On November 21, 2006, CNDC (National Council for Discrimination Combating) accepted the petition submitted by Emil Moise on exposing the religious symbols in the public schools. The CNDC’s ruling, then called the Emil Moise vs Ministry of Education case, has provided the following: “The Ministry of Education has to develop and implement within the reasonable terms an internal regulation that would regulate the presence of the religious symbols in the public educational institutions. This internal regulation should be based on the following principales:

- Should ensure the right to education and access to culture, based on the egality principal;
- Should respect the rights of the parents to ensure the children education based on their religious and philosophical beliefs;
- Should respect the laic statute and the religion autonomy;
- Should ensure the liberty of the religion, consciousness and beliefs of all the children, based on the egality principal;
- The religious symbols should be exposed within the religious education hours and in the areas designated exclusively to the religious education.

The Head of the CNCD, Csaba Ferenc Asztalos said, "[By this ruling], we have recognized the relationship between the state and religions in Romania, we have not touched upon the historical recognition of Christian contributions to the formation of the Romanian people. Now, we make an appeal to the state, through the Ministry of Education, to take responsibility for what is happening in schools in this regard. "On June 11, 2008, the High Court of Cassation and Justice decided that the presence of icons in schools is legal, basically canceling the CNCD's decision.

Asztalos expressed his opinion on the religious classes taught in Romanian schools, deplored the Church's relationship with the State, which would violate the students' right and freedom of conscience. According to him, "if it were recognized (as legitimate) that religion can only be optional, religion teachers would no longer be permanently employed in schools, but only through temporary contracts per one school year" and " the pupils' enrollment from the office to the religion classes – that is, by the state – violates the freedom of conscience, the right of parents or the legal guardian to ensure that their child is educated according to their own beliefs [because] no person in Romania is obliged to answer a question about to his belonging to a cult."

In June 2013, following the attempt carried out by the Parliamentary Commission to amend the new Constitution to make legal marriage just "between a man and a woman" (changing the current form: "between spouses"), basically prohibiting same-sex marriages, failed, The Commission also resumed the vote on the proposed day-earlier amendment providing for protection against discrimination based on sexual orientation, which was rejected. Csaba Asztalos together with other members of civil society reacted, publicly condemning the commission of political interests and discrimination against sexual minorities. He said that the new amendments (which would have forbidden same-sex marriages) "are brought to manipulate, precisely to incite, precisely to serve purposes other than a real problem" and that "at the time which we channel the society hate through acts such as the Constitution only to, for example, have a quorum in the Constitution [...] is not normal."

In an interview for the Adevărul newspaper in June 2013, he stated that "there is a risk that the CNCD will be politically engaged". He argues that the members of the CNDC college, proposed by PSD and PNL, vote the decisions on the petitions submitted based on the existing political interests.

In October 2013 Asztalos declared for Hotnews that "I am ashamed of this CNCD decision. It confirms my fears and my alarm signal that the institution can make political decisions." He referred to the institution's failure to sanction the discriminatory affirmations of some politicians, the PNL MP Alexandru Băişanu being one of the cases.

=== Incidents ===
On October 10, 2012, Csaba Asztalos was attacked on a street in the center of Bucharest by a group of four people who threatened him, sharply and injured him. He refused to comment on the incident for the moment; then filed a complaint with the Capital Police and gave an interview in which he said he received anonymous letters threatening him and his family.

A group of NGOs addressed an open letter to Prime Minister Victor Ponta asking for his physical integrity and the start of an investigation. They express "deep concern about the media attacks directed against the National Council for Combating Discrimination (CNCD), respectively the psychological and physical, but also the media," to the president of this institution. UDMR leaders publicly condemned aggression against the CNCD director.

In the same letter to the prime minister, it is also stated that the attack "took place just a few days after the public statements of the institution, represented by Mr. Csaba on the racist slips registered at the level of Steaua football club. “We believe that this attack as unacceptable and with serious negative effects on institutions that protect human rights in Romania, since most likely the motivation behind these acts is directly related to the mandate, role and decisions adopted by the Board of Directors of CNCD". The NGO group, gathered under the umbrella of the Anti-Discrimination Coalition in Romania, asked the Premier to publicly condemn the intimidation act, which has happened.
