= Lautsi v. Italy =

Case brought before the European Court of Human Rights

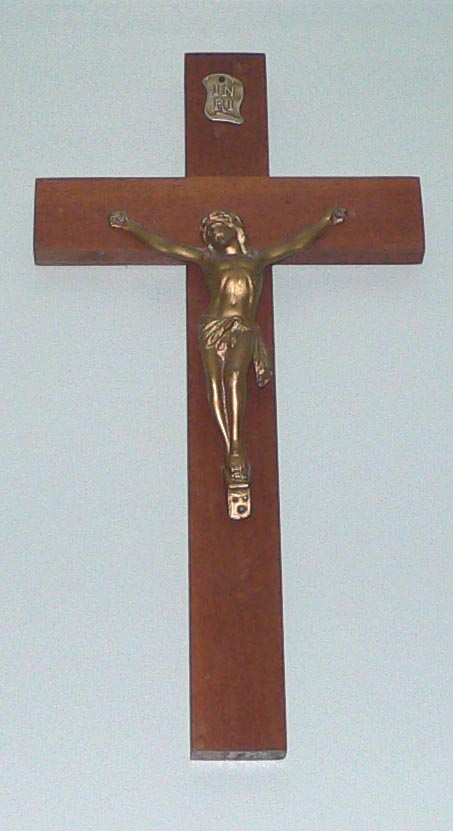
An example of a crucifix, the primary element of the case

Lautsi v. Italy was a case brought before the European Court of Human Rights, which, on 18 March 2011, ruled that the requirement in Italian law that crucifixes be displayed in classrooms of schools does not violate the European Convention on Human Rights.

== The case ==
The case stemmed from a request of Soile Lautsi, a Finnish-born Italian national, against the School Council of a school in Abano Terme (province of Padua). When the School Council decided not to comply, Lautsi applied to the Veneto Administrative Court. The administrative Court decided, on 17 March 2005, that the presence of crucifixes in State-school classrooms did not offend the principle of secularism. Lautsi appealed to the Supreme Administrative Court. The Supreme Administrative Court upheld the Veneto Court's decision reasoning that in Italy the crucifix symbolized the religious origin of values (tolerance, mutual respect, valorization of the person, affirmation of one's rights, consideration for one's freedom, the autonomy of one's moral conscience vis-à-vis authority, human solidarity and the refusal of any form of discrimination) which characterized Italian civilization and that keeping the Crucifix did not have any religious connotations.

=== European Court of Human Rights ===
Lautsi then appealed to the European Court of Human Rights on 27 July 2006. On 3 November 2009, a Chamber of the Second Section of the Court declared that there had been a violation of the European Convention on Human Rights. This decision caused uproar in Italy. Lautsi declared that she had received threats and had been a victim of vandalism, and complained about statements by politicians. The Chamber that considered the case decided that Italy was in violation of Article 9 of the European Convention of Human Rights and Article 2 of the first Protocol to the Convention, reasoning that among the plurality of meanings the crucifix might have, the religious meaning was predominant. The Chamber argued that the "negative" freedom of religion was not limited to the absence of religious services or religious education: it extended to practices and symbols expressing, in particular or in general, a belief, a religion or atheism. It added that this "negative right" deserved special protection if it was the State, through public schools, which expressed a belief, thus placing dissenters in a situation from which they could not extract themselves except by making disproportionate efforts and sacrifices. Conversely, the Court disputed the claim by the Italian state that the display in state schools of symbols associated with Catholicism served the value of pluralism.

=== Italian Government reaction ===
On 28 January 2010, the Italian government lodged an appeal to the Grand Chamber of the Court. Its position was supported by the governments of Lithuania, Slovakia and Poland; Lithuania's spokesperson stated that "Lithuania's Ministry of Foreign Affairs holds that the use of crucifixes in public in Catholic countries reflects the European Christian tradition and should not be regarded as a restriction on the freedom of religion". By July 2010, twenty countries had officially expressed their support for Italy's appeal against the ruling.

The decision of the Chamber of the Court was also deplored by the Orthodox Church of Greece.

=== European Parliament ===
In the European Parliament, two motions for resolutions were proposed: one by S&D group, calling for "recognition of ... the freedom of Member States to exhibit any religious symbol in public", and another by the GUE/NGL and Greens/EFA groups stating their belief that "only states based on the principle of the separation of church and state – as opposed to theocratic states – can find the proper solutions to safeguard everybody's right to freedom of thought, conscience and religion, the right to education and the prohibition of discrimination" and "it should not be compulsory to display religious symbols in premises used by public authorities".

=== ECHR 2010 ruling ===
In March 2010, the case was referred to Court's Grand Chamber. Ten countries, 33 MEPs (jointly) and several NGOs were authorised as third parties to present written observations, several others were refused. On 30 June 2010, a hearing was held by the Grand Chamber, which on 18 March 2011 announced its decision, reached by 15 votes to 2, to overturn the ruling of the lower Chamber. It granted that, "by prescribing the presence of crucifixes in State-schools classrooms – a sign which, whether or not it is accorded in addition a secular symbolic value, undoubtedly refers to Christianity – the regulations confer on the country's majority religion preponderant visibility in the school environment." But it declared: "That is not in itself sufficient, however, to denote a process of indoctrination on the respondent State's part and establish a breach of the requirements of Article 2 of Protocol No. 1". It added that "a crucifix on a wall is an essentially passive symbol and ... cannot be deemed to have an influence on pupils comparable to that of didactic speech or participation in religious activities".

According to F. Dimichina: "Religious freedom can be assumed as a human right, although its protection varies all over the world. The affaire Lautsi seems to demonstrate that human rights can be considered universal, even though the crucifix can stay in Italian classrooms".

== See also ==
- CNCD Decision 323/2006 (similar case in Romania)
- BGE 116 Ia 252 (similar case in Switzerland, but the Federal Supreme Court of Switzerland came to a different conclusion from that of the ECtHR)
- Religious symbols in classrooms
