= Romanian Orthodox icons =

Icons in Romanian Orthodoxy

In the Romanian Orthodox Church, icons serve much the same purpose as they do in the rest of the worldwide Orthodox Church. The art of painting them has seen a revival after the end of the communist period, and today there are many active icon painters in Romania.

In Romania, icons painted as reversed images on glass and set in frames were common in the 19th century and are still made. "In the Transylvanian countryside, the expensive icons on panels imported from Moldavia, Wallachia, and Mt. Athos were gradually replaced by small, locally produced icons on glass, which were much less expensive and thus accessible to the Transylvanian peasants..."

Although exceptions exist, "Roman Orthodox icons rarely show Jesus nailed to the cross as they do in Catholic Churches."

Religious icons and crucifixes are allowed in Romanian schools, by order of the Romania high court, in contrast to the United States.

Romanian icons commonly use a halo to indicate saints, and was used for the ghost in Shakespeare’s Hamlet as well, to indicate the supernatural character of the dead king.

== Gallery ==
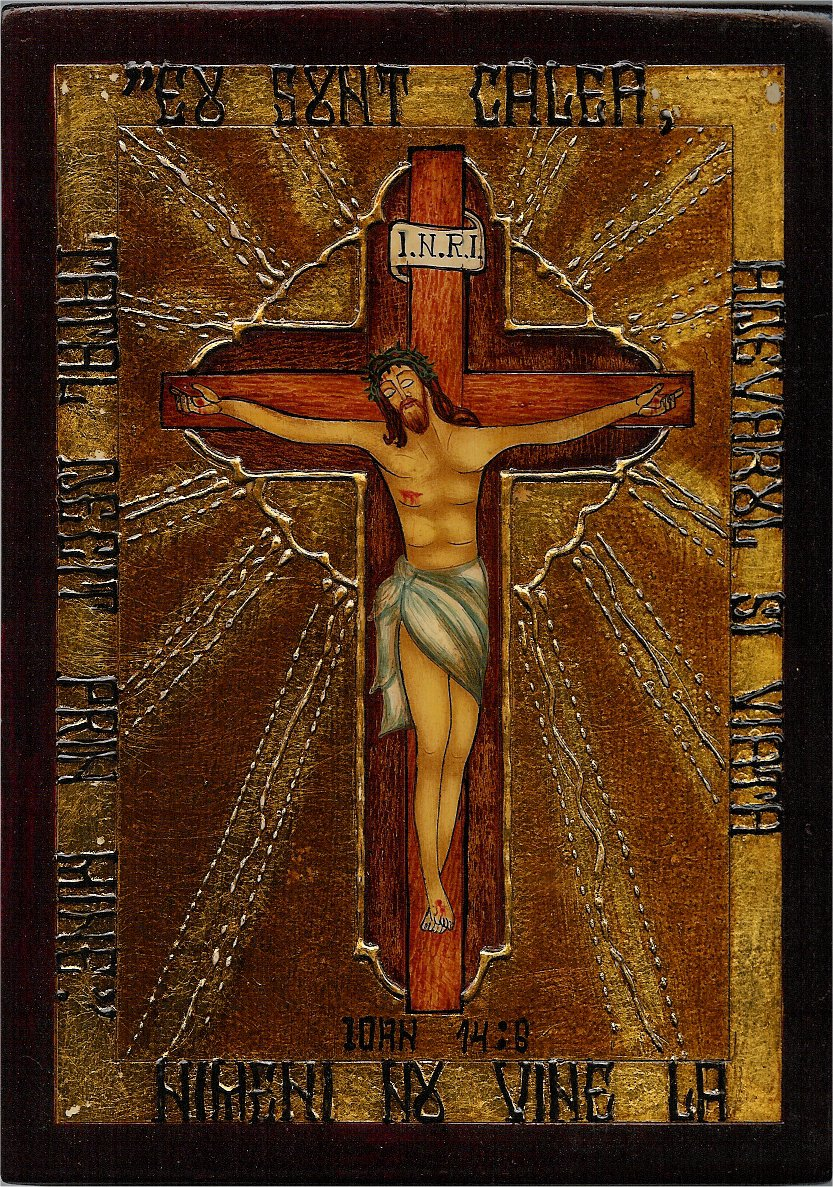
Icon of Jesus, a rare example of him nailed to the cross

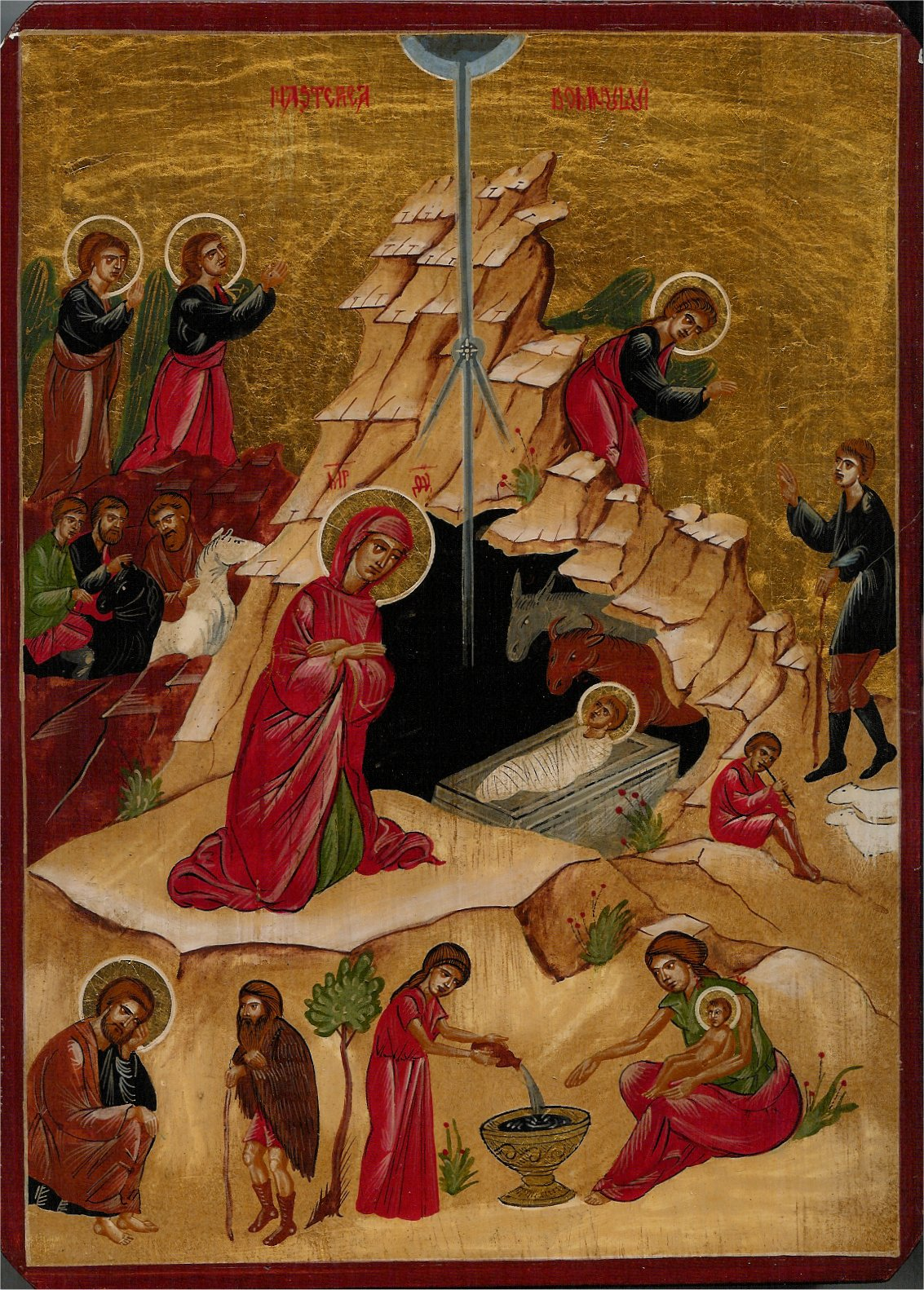
Icon of the Nativity

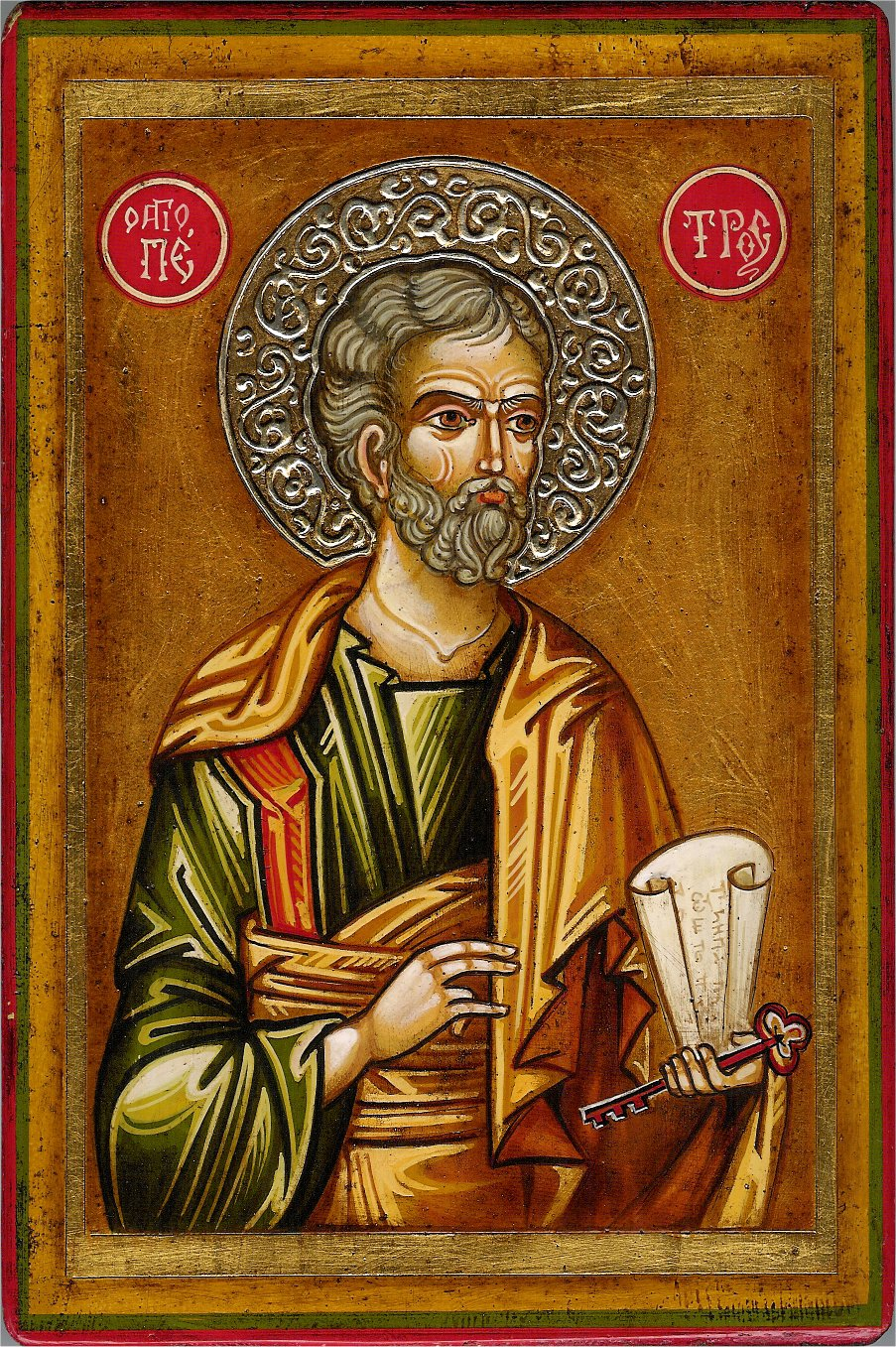
Icon of Saint Peter

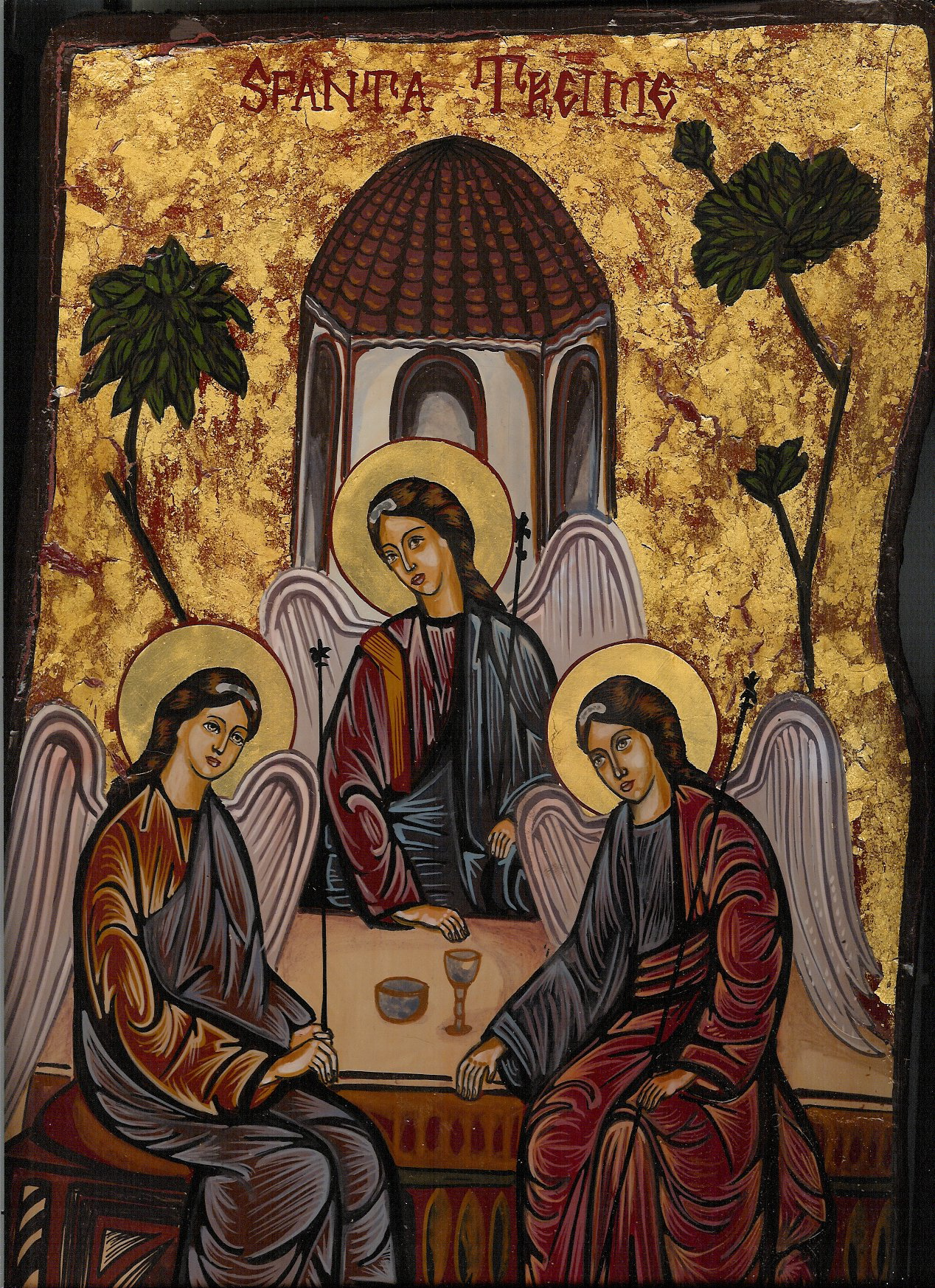
Icon of the Trinity

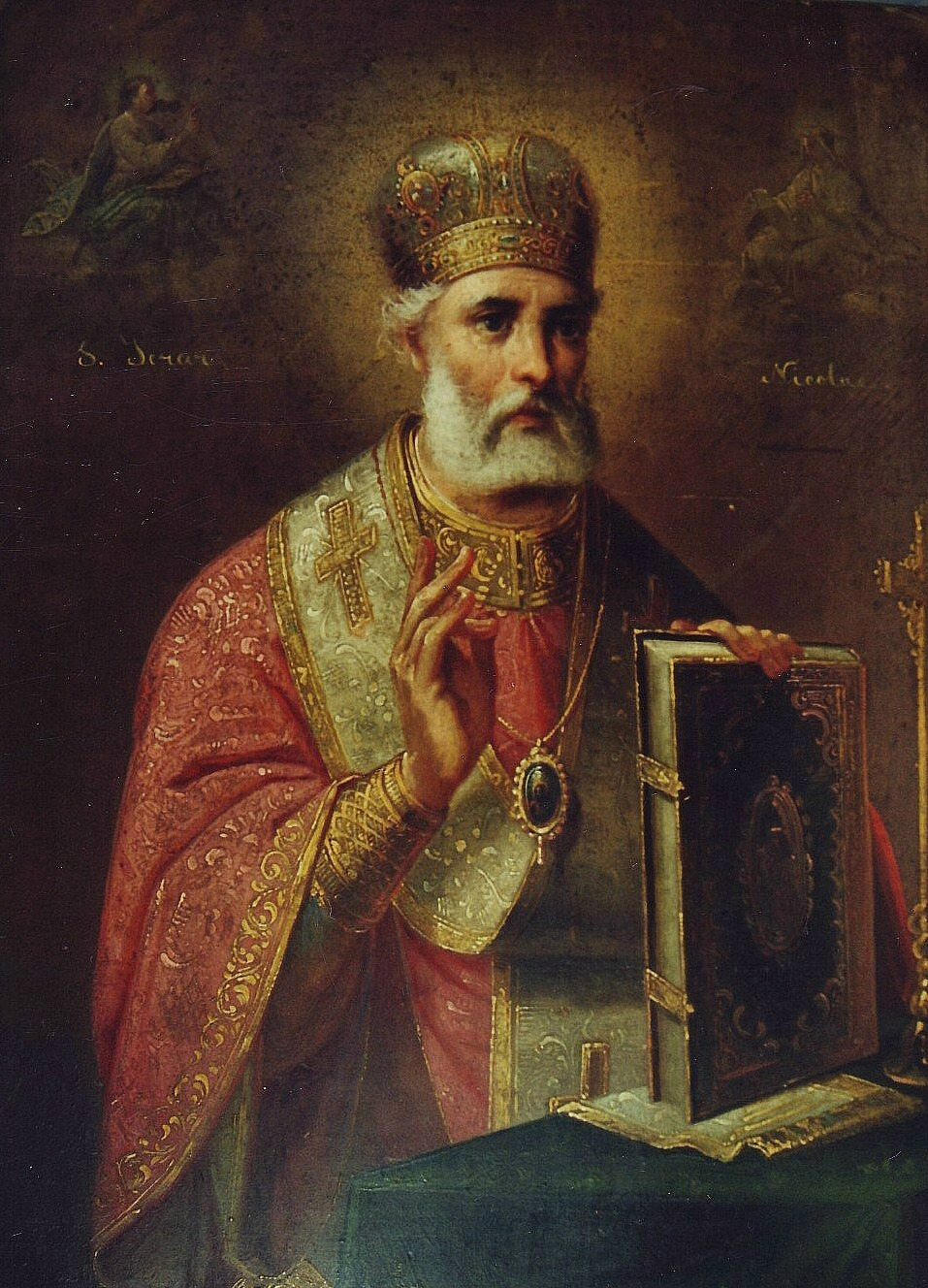
Icon of Saint Nicholas

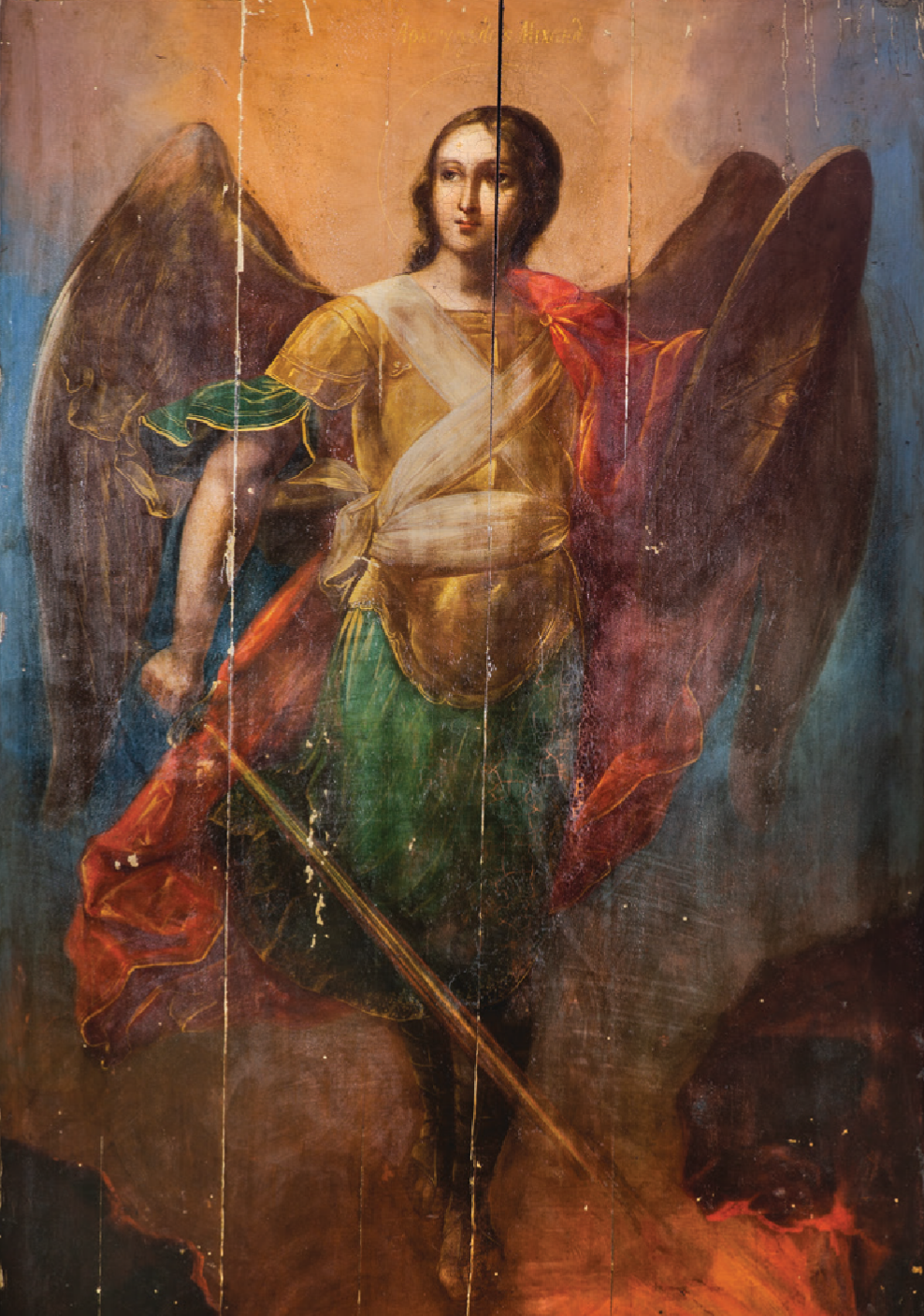
Icon of Archangel Michael

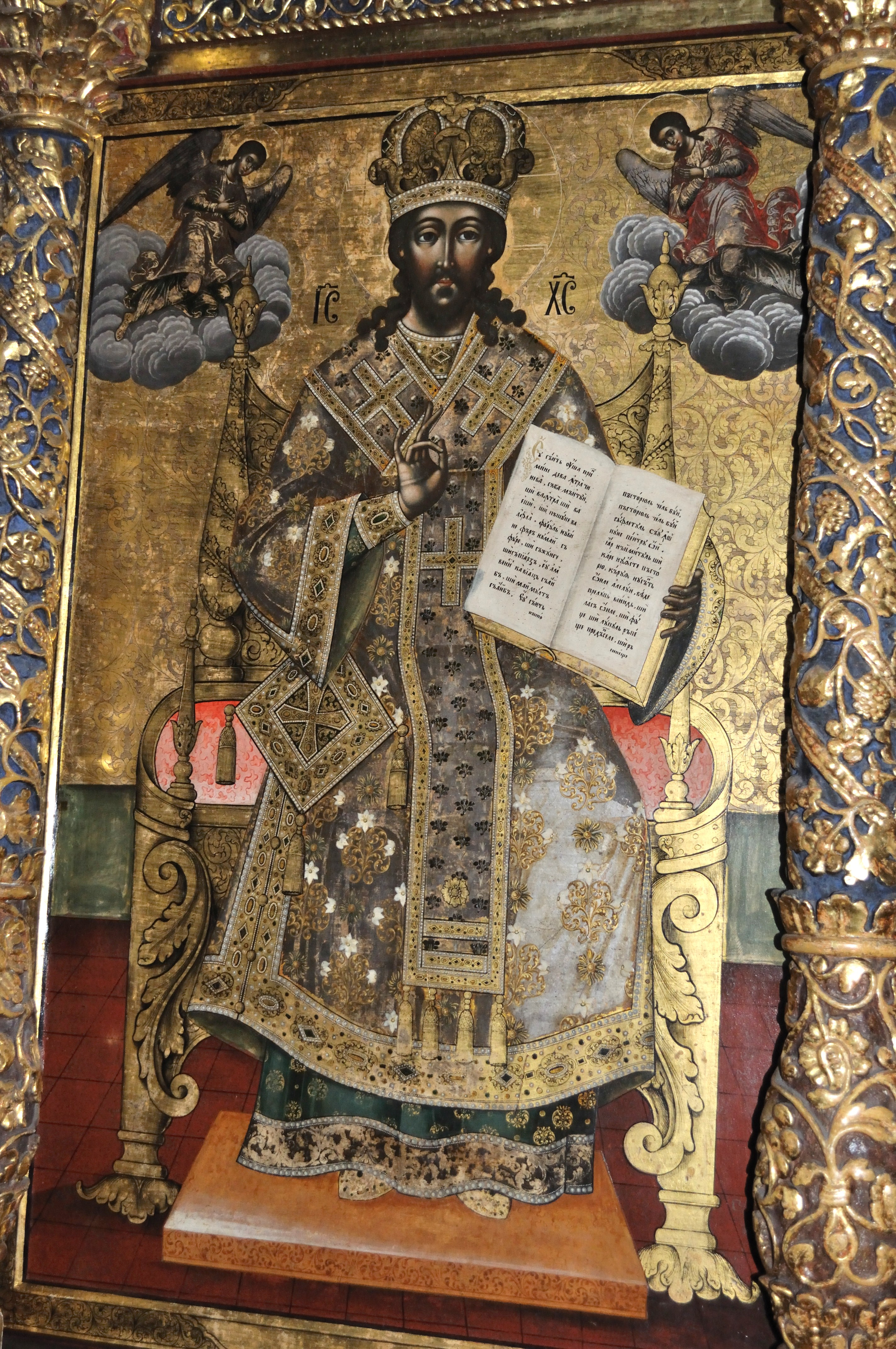
Icon of Jesus

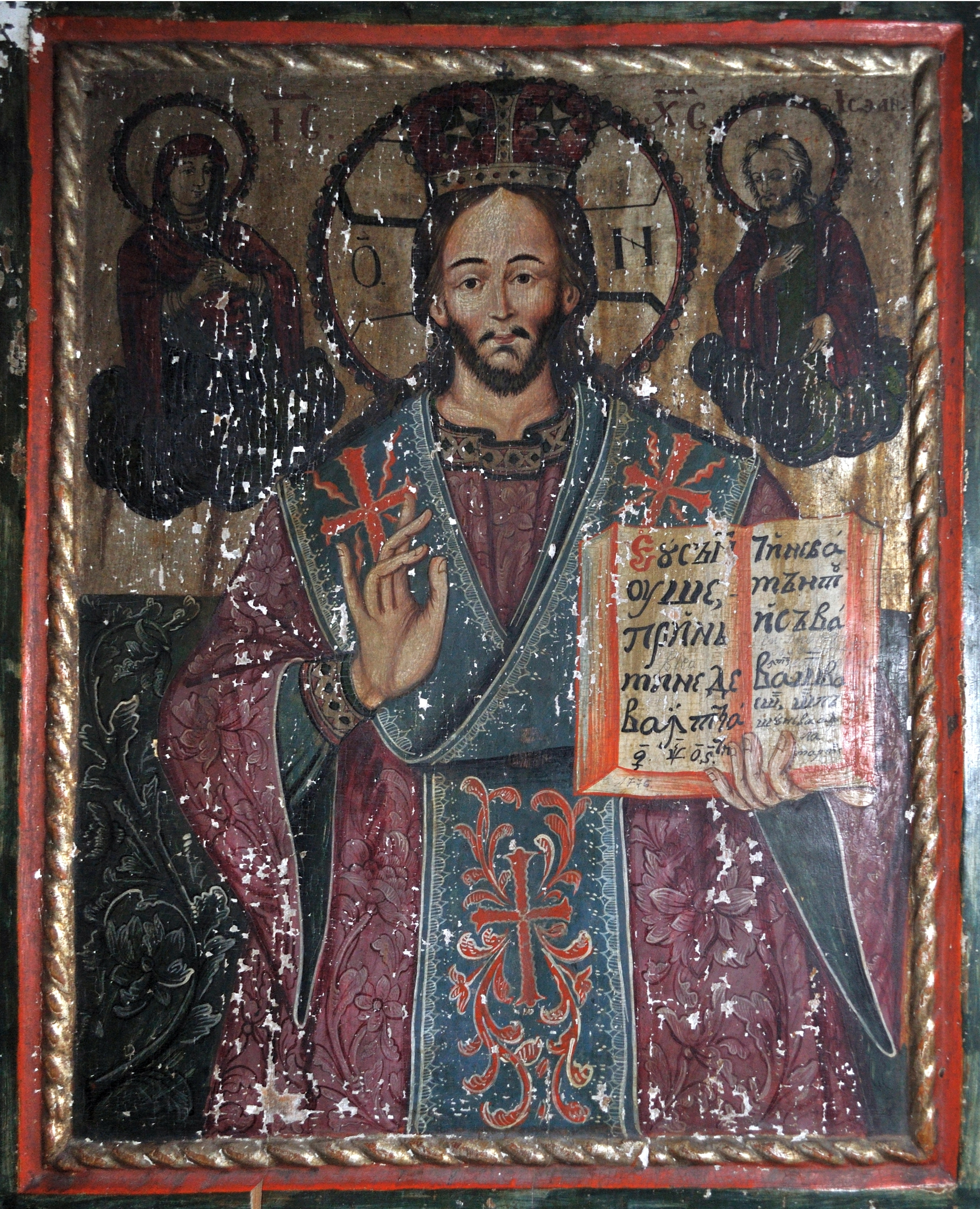
Icon of Jesus

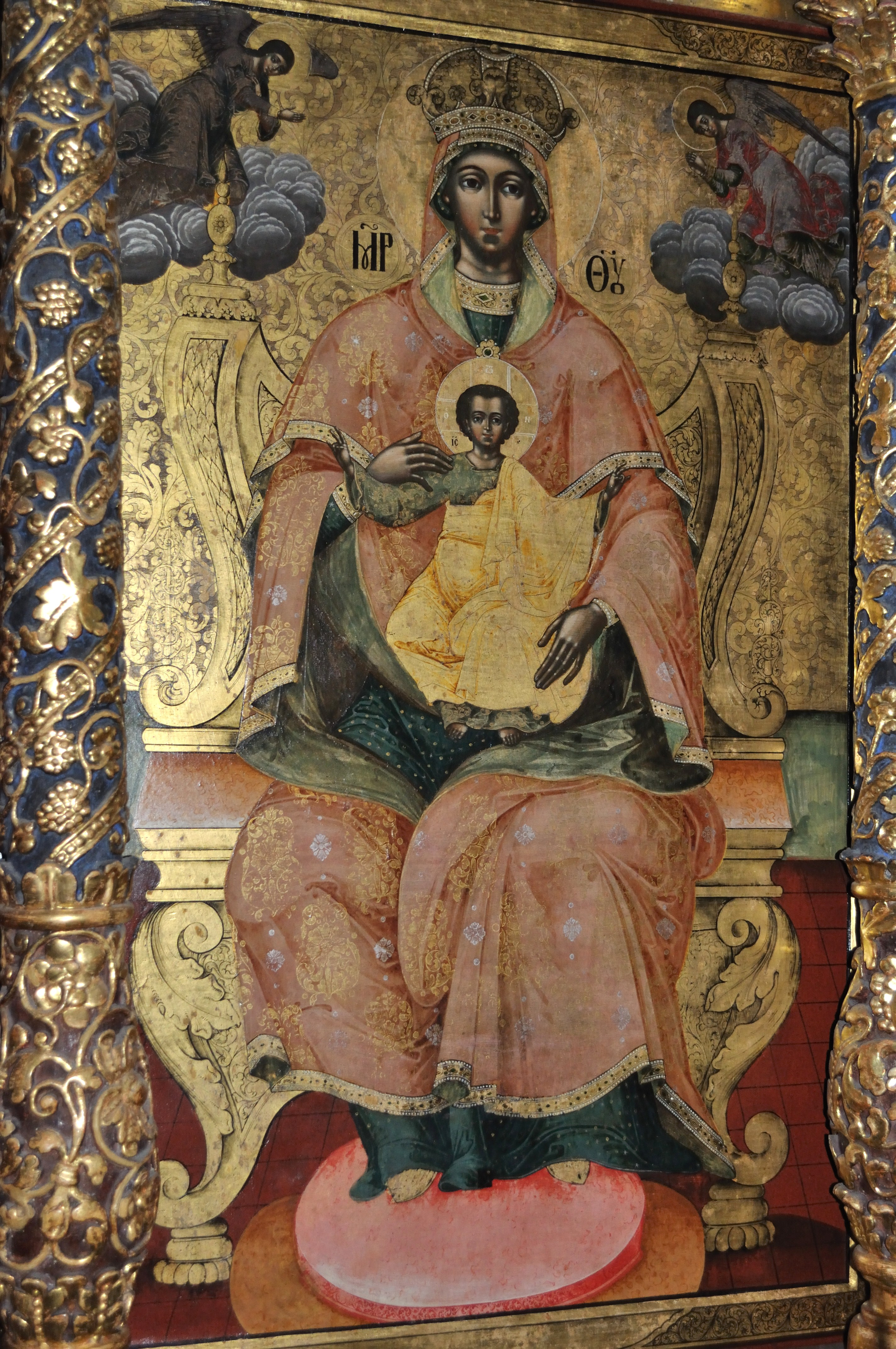
Icon of Virgin Mary

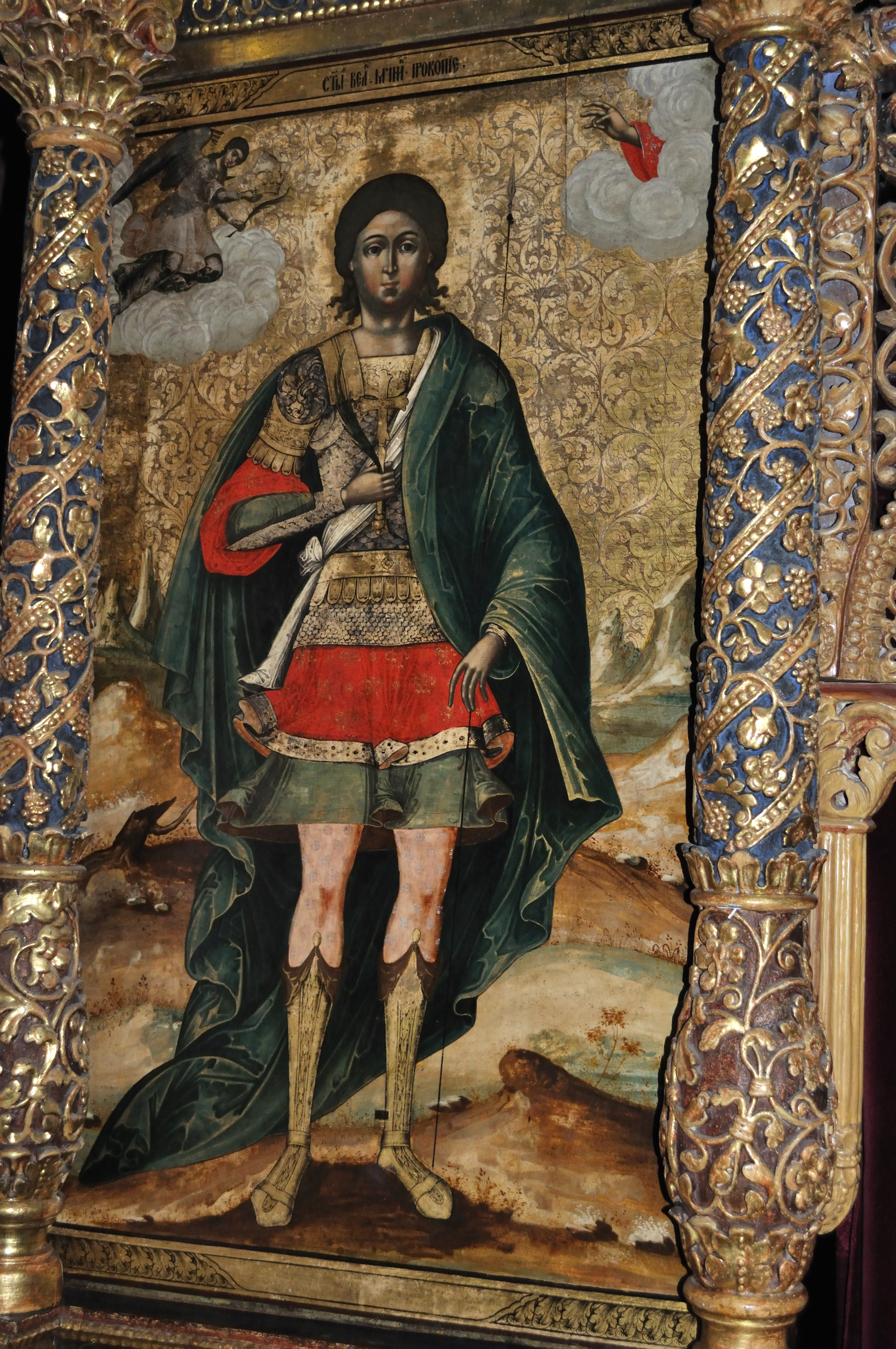
Icon of Procopius of Scythopolis

== See also ==
- Icon painting in Ukraine
