= Armorial of the governors-general of New Zealand =

Crowned arms of New Zealand as it appears on the flag of the governor-general

The following is an armorial of the individuals who have served as governor-general of New Zealand.

Almost all governors-general have been granted armorial achievements, sometimes known as coats of arms. Carved panels depicting the full achievements of former governors-general is displayed in the Tupaepae (main entrance hall) of Government House in Wellington, with the most recent addition being that of Dame Pasty Reddy.

The coats of arms of the governors-general from the Earl of Liverpool to Lord Galway were largely inherited, and so do not reflect on their lives or careers. However, those from the 1940s onwards begin to show more elements reflecting the connections between the office of governor-general and New Zealand.

Many of the armorial bearings since those of Sir Denis Blundell have been designed, in whole or in part, by Phillip O'Shea, New Zealand Herald of Arms Extraordinary.

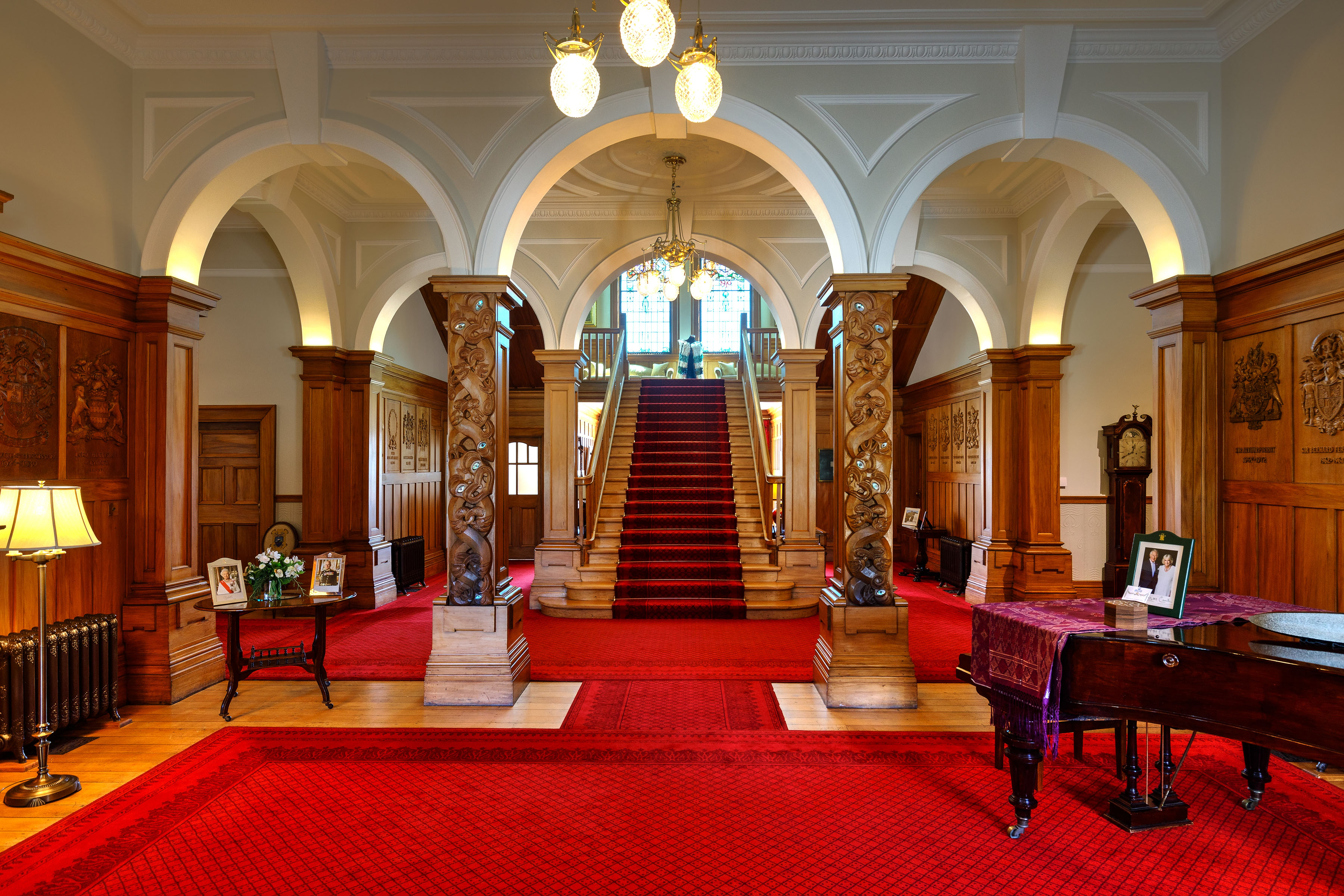
The Taupaepae (official entrance hall) in Government House, Wellington

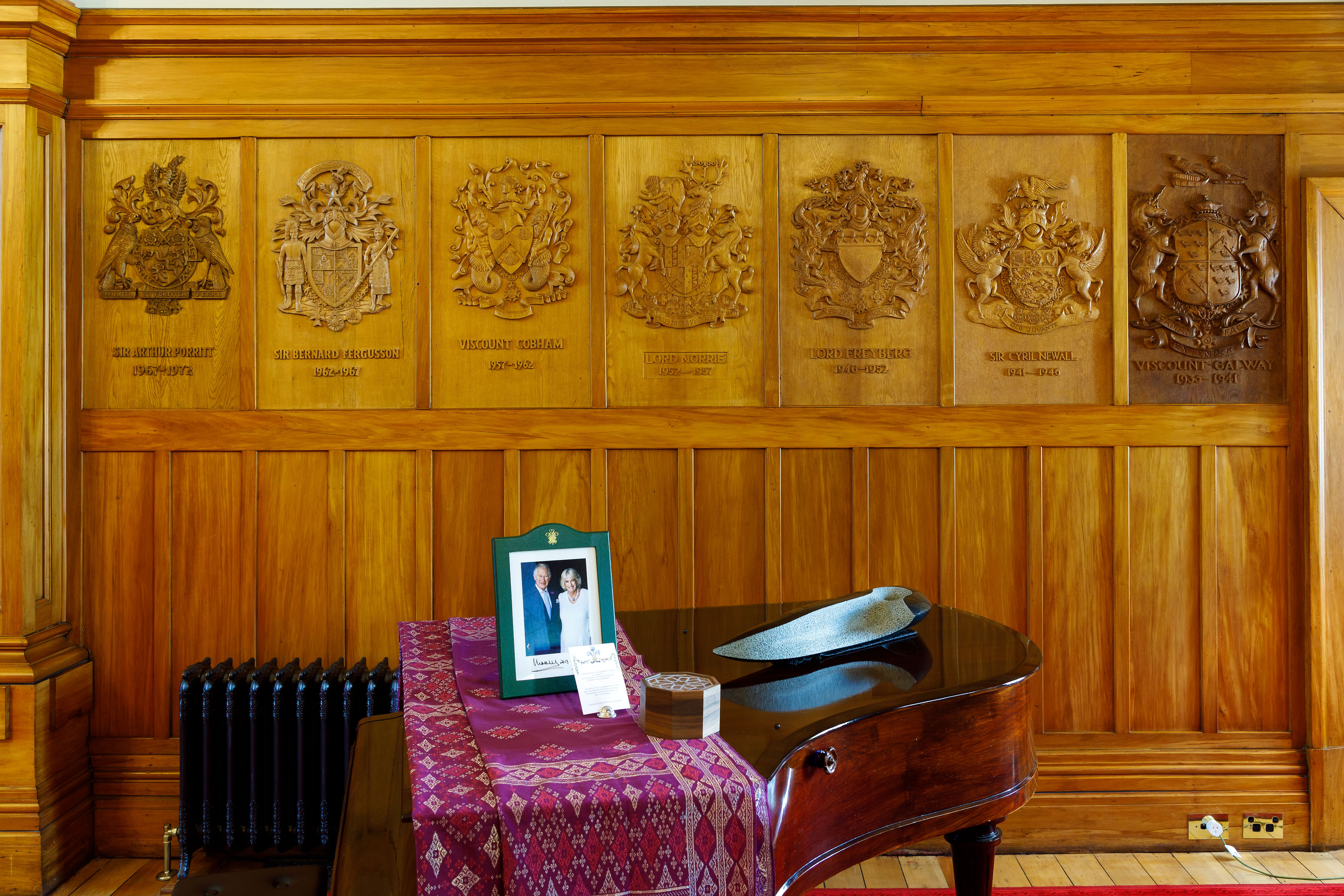
Carved armorial bearings on the walls of the Taupaepae in Government House

== Coats of arms of governors-general ==
No.	Portrait	Name	Arms	Blazon	Full achievements
1		Arthur Foljambe, Earl of Liverpool (Note: The last Governor and first Governor-general of New Zealand.)		Escutcheon: Sable a bend between six escallops or, and as an honourable augmentation (granted Aug 1906) on the bend in chief on an escutcheon vert a key surmounted by a baton in saltire or. Crests: Centre: On a chapeau gules, turned up ermine, a lion rampant gules, charged on the shoulder with a besant, thereon an eagle displayed sable, and resting the dexter hind paw on a plate, charged with a bend azure, thereon three garbs or, and surmounted by an escutcheon argent, charged with an eagle displayed sable, charged on the breast with a fleur-de-lis or, the Lion crowned gold, and supporting with the forepaws a Man-of-War's Church pennant proper (honourable augmentation). Dexter: A seaweed rock proper, thereon a heraldic sea-lion sejant azure, resting the dexter paw on an escutcheon per fess wavy argent and azure, in chief a cormorant sable, beaked and legged gules, holding in the beak a branch of seaweed (called laver) inverted vert, and in base a hawk, wings elevated and addorsed argent. Sinister: A man's leg unarmed, couped at the thigh, quarterly or and sable, spurred gold. Coronet: That of an earl Supporters: On either side, a griffin, wings elevated or, beaked, membered, ducally gorged, and on the wing three fleurs-de-lis, one and two, all azure, the dexter charged on the breast with a torteau, thereon a cross-crosslet fitchée argent (badge of Howard); and the sinister charged on the breast with a pellet, thereon a stag's head caboshed argent (badge of Cavendish). Mottos: Over centre crest: Bydd ddiysgog (Be steadfast); Over dexter crest: Demoures ferme (Be fast); Over sinister crest: Bee fast; Under the arms: Soyes ferme (Be steadfast)	
2		John Jellicoe, Viscount Jellicoe		Escutcheon: Argent, three bars wavy azure, over all a whale hauriant sable. Crest: Out of a naval crown or, a demi-wolf azure. Coronet: That of a viscount Supporters: On either side a sea-griffin or. Motto: Sui memores merendo (Remembered for their merits - referencing Virgil's Aeneid, VI, 664)	
3		Sir Charles Fergusson (Note: Father of Sir Bernard Fergusson.)		Escutcheon: Quarterly: 1st grandquarter azure, a buckle argent between three boars' heads couped or, armed and langued gules (Fergusson of Kilkerran); 2nd grandquarter, counter-quartered: 1st and 4th argent, an eagle displayed sable beaked and membered gules (Ramsay); 2nd and 3rd gules, a chevron between three fleurs de lis or (Broun of Colston); 3rd grandquarter, counterquartered: 1st and 4th or, a lion rampant couped at all joints gules within a double tressure flory counter flory azure (Maitland); 2nd and 3rd argent, a shakefork sable (Cunningham of Glencairn): 4th grandquarter or, on a saltire azure nine lozenges of the first, on a bordure of the second eight mullets and as many boars' heads erased alternately argent (Dalrymple of New Hailes). Crest: A bee on a thistle proper. Mottos: Dulcius ex asperis (Sweeter after difficulties); on compartment: Ut prosim aliis (May I profit others)	
4		Charles Bathurst, Lord Bledisloe		Escutcheon: Sable two bars ermine, in chief three cross pattée or. Crest: A dexter arm in mail embowed, holding in the hand all proper, a club with spike or. Coronet: That of a viscount Supporters: On either side a bull guardant gules, ringed, and a line therefrom reflexed over the back or. Motto: Tien ta foy (Keep thy faith)	
5		George Monckton-Arundell, Viscount Galway		Escutcheon: Quarterly, 1st and 4th sable, six swallows, three, two and one, argent (Arundell); 2nd and 3rd sable, on a chevron, between three martlets or, as many mullets of the field (Monckton). Crest: 1st, On a chapeau azure doubled, turned up ermine, a swallow argent (Arundell); 2nd, A martlet or (Monckton). Coronet: That of a viscount Supporters: Two unicorns ermine, crined, armed and unguled, each gorged with an eastern diadem or. Motto: Famam Extendere Factis (To extend my fame by deeds)	
6		Sir Cyril Newall		Escutcheon: Per pale azure and gules two lions passant guardant in pale or on a chief ermine a rose of the second barbed and seeded between a lotus flower and a sprig of New Zealand fern all proper. Crest: Issuant from an astral crown or an eagle wings elevated sable breathing flames proper. Coronet: That of a baron Supporters: On either side a pegasus argent gorged with an astral crown or. Motto: Deo Juvante (With God's help)	
7		Bernard Freyberg, Lord Freyberg		Escutcheon: Or, on a chief sable four mullets of the field. Crest: A demi lion gules holding between the paws an eagle displayed sable Coronet: That of a baron Supporters: On either side a salamander proper. Motto: New Zeal and Honour (a play on "New Zealand Honour")	
8		Sir Willoughby Norrie		Escutcheon: Quarterly: 1st and 4th, ermine, on a pale gules three helmets argent (Norrie); 2nd and 3rd, or, on a chevron azure between two poplar trees eradicated in chief proper, and a mullet of six points in base azure, a key the wards downwards or (Moke). Crest: Dexter, an elephant's head erased sable, tusked argent, supporting with the trunk a garb or (Norrie). Sinister, stag's head couped, holding in the mouth a branch of poplar proper, between the attired a key as in the arms pendant from a chain or (Moke). Coronet: That of a baron Supporters: On either side a dark bay racehorse supporting between the forelegs a frond of New Zealand fern proper. Motto: Deus nobis providet (God provides for us)	
9		Charles Lyttelton, Viscount Cobham		Escutcheon: Argent, a chevron between three escallops sable (Lyttelton). Crest: A Moor's head in profile, couped at the shoulders proper, wreathed about the temples argent and sable. Coronet: That of a viscount Supporters: On either side a merman proper, holding in the exterior hand a trident or. Motto: Ung Dieu, ung roy (One God, one King)	
10		Sir Bernard Fergusson (Note: Son of Sir Charles Fergusson.)		Escutcheon: Quarterly: 1st grandquarter azure, a buckle argent between three boars' heads couped or armed and langued gules (Fergusson of Kilkerran) 2nd grandquarter, counterquartered; 1st and 4th argent, an eagle displayed sable beaked and membered gules (Ramsay); 2nd and 3rd gules, a chevron between three fleurs de lis or (Broun of Colston): 3rd grandquarter, counterquartered; 1st and 4th or, a lion rampant couped at all joints gules within a double tressure flory counter flory azure (Maitland); 2nd and 3rd argent, a shakefork sable (Cunningham of Glencairn): 4th grandquarter or, on a saltire azure nine lozenges of the first, on a bordure of the second eight mullets and as many boars' heads erased alternately argent (Dalrymple of New Hailes): the whole within a bordure argent for difference. Crest: Issuing out of a mullet argent a bee on a thistle proper. Coronet: That of a baron Supporters: Dexter, a soldier of the 42nd Highlanders, the Black Watch (The Royal Highland Regiment), attired in the full dress uniform of that regiment, including sporran and the feature bonnet as worn in the early 20th century; sinister, a Māori chieftain attired about the waist in a korowai (or mat) argent, embellished with strings sable, and over his left shoulder another korowai or, also embellished with strings sable, and embroidered sable and gules, two huia feathers in his hair, his face tattooed, a kuru (greenstone pendant) suspended from his dexter ear, his sinister hand grasping the shaft, and his dexter hand the tuft, of a taiaha (spear) held in bend sinister, point downwards proper. Motto: Dulcius ex asperis (Sweeter after difficulties)	
11		Sir Arthur Porritt		Escutcheon: Or, a serpent in bend vert between two lions' heads erased gules, on a chief of the last two swords points upwards in saltire of the first, between as many roses argent both surmounted by another gules barbed and seeded proper. Crest: On a wreath or and gules, a demi heraldic antelope gules armed azure collared or, holding a torch of the last enflamed proper between two fern fronds vert. Coronet: That of a baron Supporters: On the dexter side an eagle and on the sinister side a tūī bird both proper. Motto: Sapienter et fortiter ferre (To bear bravely and wisely)	
12		Sir Denis Blundell		Escutcheon: Barruly argent and sable on a chief vert three pallets or in front of the centre pallet a torteau gules. Crest: Two branches of laurel leaved and fructed proper an acorn argent in front of an escallop reversed gules. Supporters: Dexter: an owl proper; Sinister: a moa proper. Motto: To Serve with Tolerance	
13		Sir Keith Holyoake		Escutcheon: Per pale or and gules, on a mount in base counterchanged a holly tree gules fructed or dimidiating an oak tree or fructed gules, two apples slipped in chief and a like apple in base all counterchanged. Crest: A kiwi supporting with the dexter claw a Māori whale-bone patu-parāoa proper ensigned by a representation of the royal crown. Supporters: On the dexter side an Aberdeen angus bull supporting a mace representing that of the New Zealand House of Representatives, and on the sinister side a Coopworth ram supporting a black rod representing that of the New Zealand Parliament, all proper. Motto: Be zealous, compassionate and loyal	
14		Sir David Beattie		Escutcheon: Gules, on a chevron engrailed argent between three full bottomed wigs a royal crown between two bees proper. Crest: Upon a wreath argent and gules, issuant from a circlet of estoiles azure and Pōhutukawa (metrosideros excelsa) blossom a Pīwakawaka fantail (Rhipidura fuliginosa) proper. Supporters: Dexter: A male athlete proper wearing shorts and a singlet sable. Sinister: A judge of the High Court of New Zealand in full ceremonial robes proper. Motto: Pro civitate (For the Nation)	
15		Sir Paul Reeves		Escutcheon: Per pale and per chevron embowed and enhanced argent and azure, three mitres (two and one) the infulae adorned with the Māori pītau kōwhaiwhai pattern and three estoiles (one and two) all counterchanged, in the fess point a royal crown and cap of estate proper. Crest: Upon a helm with a wreath argent and azure a circlet of the Māori poutama stepped pattern, statant thereon a tūī or parson bird (Prosthemadera novaseelandiae) proper holding aloft in its dexter claw three feathers argent their quills crossing in base. Supporters: On the dexter a brown kiwi (Apteryx australis) and sinister a kōtuku or white heron (Egretta alba) beaks downward proper each gorged with an ancient crown and supporting with the interior foot crozier or with the shaft adorned with the Māori pītau kōwhaiwhai pattern proper. Compartment: A grassy mount with fern fronds growing therefrom proper. Motto: Whakarongo ("To listen" or "To be informed")	
16		Dame Catherine Tizard		Escutcheon: Barry wavy argent and azure overall a lymphad oars in action the sail sable (Maclean) charged with a representation of the royal crown proper pennons gules between three escallops or. Crest: Upon a helm with a wreath argent and azure within a circlet upon the rim eight New Zealand ferns (five manifest) argent a cat a mountain guardant sable (Macpherson) holding in its foreclaws a "Kate Sheppard" camellia slipped and leaved proper mantled azure doubled argent. Supporters: Two New Zealand wood pigeons wings elevated addorsed proper that on the dexter supporting with its interior foot a representation of the mace of the House of Representatives of New Zealand and that on the sinister likewise supporting with its interior foot a representation of the mace of the city of Auckland. All on a compartment comprising a grassy mount from which grow New Zealand fern and thistles all proper. Motto: Floreat Feles Felix (May the happy cat flourish)	
17		Sir Michael Hardie Boys		Escutcheon: Gules between two pallets argent a cross formy convex or on each limb a mullet gules on a chief or the royal crown between two full bottomed wigs proper. Crest: Perched on a log fesswise a New Zealand bellbird proper holding in the beak an anchor or. Supporters: On either side a North Island weka proper. Motto: Certus et Constans (Sure and Steadfast - in reference to the Boys' Brigade)	
18		Dame Silvia Cartwright	None (Note: Dame Silvia Cartwright declined to seek armorial bearings. Her carved panel instead depicts her honours: the collar of the New Zealand Order of Merit, insignia of the Principal Companion of the Queen's Service Order and insignia of a Dame Commander of the Order of the British Empire.)		
19		Sir Anand Satyanand		Escutcheon: Gules a white fronted tern or tara (Sterna striata) volant proper between three trumpet shells (Charonia tritonis) palewise and in centre chief a pair of scales or. Crest: A North Island brown kiwi (Apteryx australis mantelli) supporting a mace representing that of the New Zealand House of Representatives palewise or and between the mace and kiwi a barrister’s wig proper. Supporters: On either side an Indian elephant sable about its neck a wreath of karaka (Corynocarpus laevigatus) vert fructed with orange drupes proper. Motto: Through truth comes joy	
20		Sir Jerry Mateparae		Escutcheon: Vert on a fess invected argent a fess per fess indented of three points gules and sable thereon a wave crested of three points each in the form of a koru argent all between three whalebone clubs or kotiate bendwise sinister also argent in the centre chief a royal crown proper. Crest: Upon a helm with a wreath argent and vert a fantail or pīwakawaka wings extended fesswise the head lowered and the tail displayed upwards proper thereon five mullets in cross gules fimbriated argent mantled argent doubled vert. Supporters: Dexter a European woman proper vested in a long evening dress and wearing slippers vert gorged with a cord also vert pendant therefrom a greenstone pendant or pounamu kuru and holding in the dexter arm its head to the sinister a ginger and white cat proper. Sinister A Māori vested in the uniform of a Lieutenant of the Royal New Zealand Infantry Regiment with collar badges wearing a service dress shirt and tie with a Sam Browne belt hanging to the sinister therefrom an infantry officer's sword on his head a khaki lemon squeezer hat proper the puggaree thereon khaki gules and khaki and worn over the shoulders a Māori cloak or kaitaka proper. Motto: He Tāngata He Tāngata He Tāngata (It is the people, it is the people, it is the people.)	
21		Dame Patsy Reddy		Escutcheon: Gules between two Cotises bendwise two masks bendwise in bend one of comedy in chief and the other of tragedy in base the ties hanging inwards those in base overlapping those in chief all between two pūtōrino (Māori bugle flutes) bendwise or. Badge: A female huia proper statant on a fern frond curved upwards to the dexter vert all within a solid circular chain charged with four stylised mānuka flowers in cross or. Supporters: On a compartment vert on which are red pōhutukawa blossom and yellow kōwhai flowers slipped and leaved two tīeke birds proper. Motto: He toi whakairo he mana tangata (Where there is artistic excellence there is human dignity)	
22		Dame Cindy Kiro (Note: Current governor-general.)	No arms granted as yet		

== Coats of arms of governors ==
Several governors of New Zealand also had, mostly inherited, armorial bearings.

No.	Portrait	Name	Arms	Blazon	Full achievements
1		William Hobson	No arms known		
2		Robert FitzRoy	No arms known		
3		Sir George Grey		Escutcheon: Barry of six argent and azure, in chief three pellets (Note: Other sources give "torteaux" (i.e. a red roundel) instead of "pellets".) and label of three points ermine. Crest: A unicorn passant ermine armed, maned, tufted and unguled or, in front of a sun in splendour. Motto: Stabilis (Steadfast)	
4		Thomas Gore Browne	No arms known		
5		Sir George Ferguson Bowen	No arms known		
6		Sir James Fergusson (Note: Father of Sir Charles Fergusson, and grandfather of Sir Bernard Fergusson)		Escutcheon: Azure, an arming buckle between three boars' heads or. Crest: On a thistle leaved and flowered proper a bee or. Motto: Dulcius ex asperis (Sweeter out of difficulties)	
7		George Phipps, Marquess of Normanby		Escutcheon: Quarterly: 1st and 4th, sable, a trefoil slipped within an orle of eight mullets, argent, Phipps; 2nd, paly of six, argent and azure, a bend, gules, Annesley; 3rd, the arms of King James II. within a border compony, ermine and azure. Crest: A lion's jamb erased, sable, holding a trefoil slipped, argent. Supporters: Dexter, a unicorn, ermine, armed, unguled, crined, and tufted, or, and gorged with a chaplet of roses; sinister, a goat, ermine, armed and unguled, azure, gorged as the dexter. Motto: Virtute quies (Rest in virtue)	
8		Sir Hercules Robinson		Escutcheon: Vert, a chevron engrailed between three bucks at gaze or, each charged on the shoulder with a fleur-de-lis azure. Crest: Out of a crown vallory or, a mount vert, thereon a buck as in the arms. Motto: Legi, regi, fidus (Faithful to the Law and the King)	
9		Sir Arthur Hamilton-Gordon		Escutcheon: Quarterly: 1st and 4th azure, three boars' heads couped within a double tressure flory counter-flory, adorned alternately with thistles and fleurs-de-lis, or Gordon; 2nd and 3rd quarterly, within a bordure sable, 1st and 4th gules, three cinquefoils pierced ermine, Hamilton; 2nd and 3rd argent, a lymphad sable, Arran. Crests: 1st, two arms from the shoulder naked proper, holding a bent bow or, and in the act of letting fly an arrow proper; 2nd, out of a ducal coronet or, an oak tree, the stem cut transversely by a frame saw, the blade inscribed with the word “Through,” all proper; the body of the tree charged with an escutcheon argent, thereon a heart gules for difference. Supporters: Dexter, a chief of the Fiji Islands, habited, and supporting with the exterior hand a club, all proper; sinister, an Adigar of the Island of Ceylon, habited, and holding in the exterior hand a staff of office, all proper. Motto: Haud Immemor (Not unmindful)	
10		Sir William Jervois	No arms known		
11		William Onslow, Earl of Onslow		Escutcheon: Argent: a fesse gules, between six Cornish choughs sable, beaked and membered gules. Crest: An eagle sable, preying on a partridge or. Supporters: Two falcons close proper, belled or. Motto: Festina lente (Quick, without impetuosity)	
12		David Boyle, Earl of Glasgow		Escutcheon: Quarterly: 1st and 4th or, an eagle with two heads displayed gules; a coat of augmentation for the earldom of Glasgow; 2nd and 3rd per bend embattled argent and gules, Boyle; over all an escutcheon or, charged with three stags’ horns gules, for the paternal coat of Boyle of Kelburne. Crest: An eagle with two heads displayed per pale embattled gules and argent. Supporters: Dexter, a savage, wreathed round the temples and loins, and holding in the dexter hand a branch of laurel all proper; sinister, a lion per pale embattled argent and gules. Motto: Dominus providebit (The Lord will provide)	
13		Uchter Knox, Earl of Ranfurly		Escutcheon: Gules: a falcon volant or, within an orle, wavy on the outer, and engrailed on the inner edge, argent. Crest: A falcon close, standing on a perch proper. Supporters: Two falcons, wings inverted proper, beaked, membered, belled, ducally collared and lined, or. Motto: Moveo et proficior (I move and prosper)	
14		William Plunket, Lord Plunket		Escutcheon: Sable, a bend argent between a tower in the sinister chief and a portcullis in the dexter base or. Crest: A horse, passant argent, charged on the side with a portcullis sable. Supporters: Dexter, an antelope or; sinister, a horse argent, each gorged with a plain collar sable, pendent therefrom a portcullis, also sable. Motto: Festina lente (Quick, without impetuosity)	
15		John Dickson-Poynder, Lord Islington		Escutcheon: Quarterly: 1st and 4th, pily counterpily of four traits or and sable, the points ending in crosses formée, two in chief and one in base, in the centre chief point a castle of the second and in base two martlets of the first, a chief azure, thereon a key erect, the wards upwards and to the sinister gold between a rose on the dexter and a fleur-de-lis on the sinister argent, Poynder; 2nd and 3rd, azure, an anchor erect encircled with an oak wreath vert between three mullets pierced or; on a chief paly of seven of the last and gules, a mural crown argent, Dickson. Crests: 1st, issuant out of the battlements of a castle argent charged with a cross-flory gules, a dexter cubit arm, vested sable, charged with a key as in the arms, cuff or, the hand proper holding a cross patee fitchee in bend also argent; 2nd, over an armed arm brandishing a falchion proper, a trident and spear in saltire or. Supporters: Dexter, an eagle proper; sinister, a lion gules; each gorged with a collar or, pendant therefrom a bezant charged with a rose gules. Motto: Fortes fortuna juvat (Fortune favours the brave)	
16		Arthur Foljambe, Earl of Liverpool	See governors-general table above		

== See also ==
- List of governors-general of New Zealand
- New Zealand heraldry
- Coat of arms of New Zealand
- Roll of arms
- Armorial of the governors-general of Australia
- Armorial of the governors general of Canada
- Armorial of prime ministers of the United Kingdom
- Armorial of presidents of the United States
