= Armorial of the governors general of Canada =

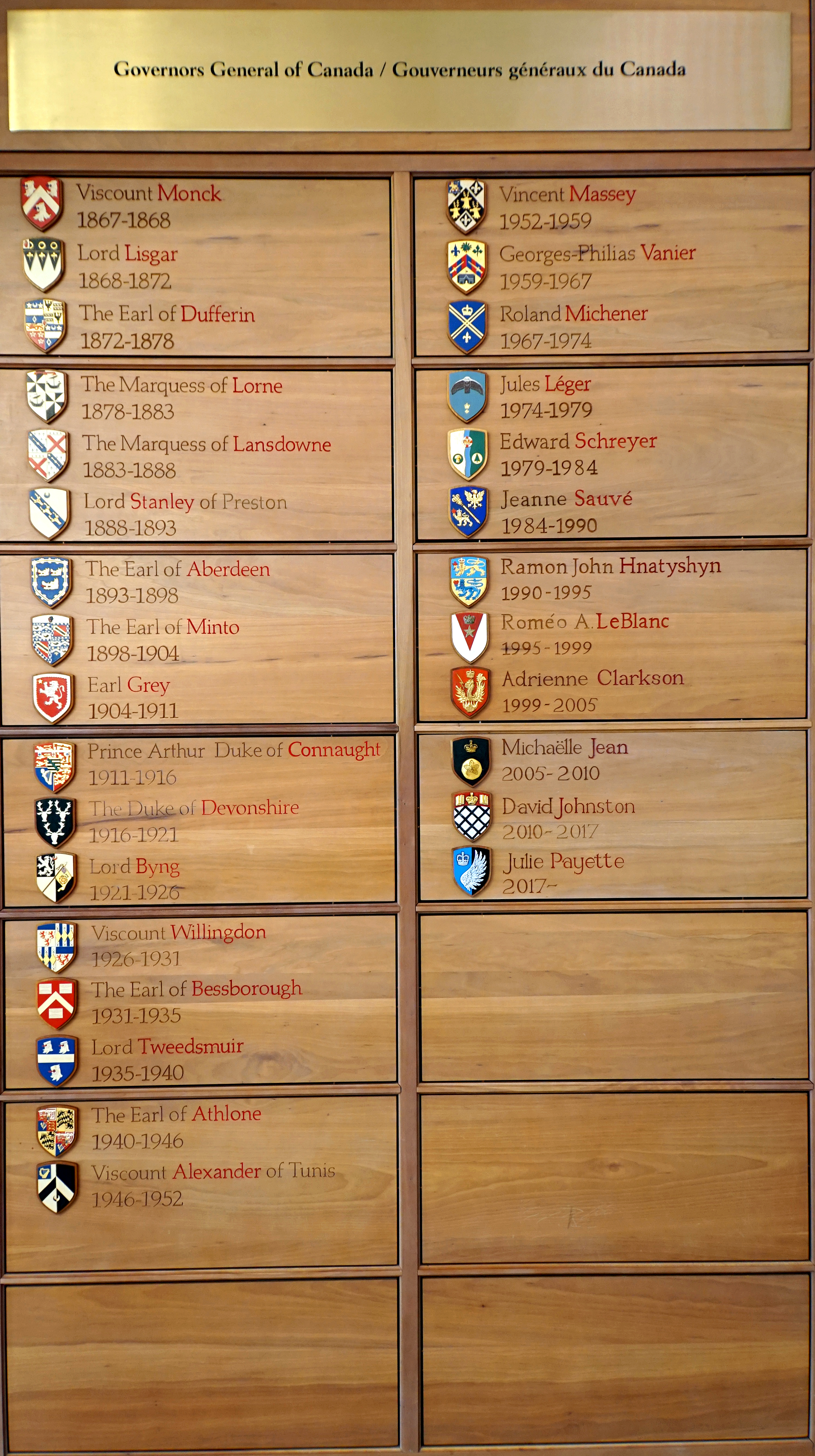
Armorial of the governors general of Canada at Rideau Hall (photograph taken during the tenure of Julie Payette)

The following is an armorial of the thirty one individuals who have served as governor general of Canada since Confederation.

To date, all governors general have been granted armorial achievements, otherwise known as coats of arms, with the most recent being granted to Mary Simon in 2022.

Prior to 1952, the majority of governors general inherited their arms and as such the designs of those arms usually do not reflect them personally. Plaster carvings of the coats of arms of the first twelve governors general after confederation, from Lord Monck to Lord Byng, are displayed in the chambers of the Speaker of the Senate of Canada.

== Coats of arms of governors general ==
No.	Portrait	Name	Shield of arms	Blazon	Full achievement
1		Lord Monck (Note: The first Governor General of Canada after Canadian Confederation.)		Escutcheon: Gules: a chevron between three lions' heads, erased, argent. Crest: A wyvern, wings elevated, sable. (Note: Other sources instead give the blazon for the crest as: A dragon passant wings elevated sable. There are discrepancies between different depictions of his arms, with both wyverns and dragons having been used interchangably in the crest and/or for the dexter supporter.) Coronet: That of a viscount Supporters: Dexter, a dragon; sinister, a lion, both argent, and holding in the fore paw a branch of laurel, resting on the shoulder, vert, fructed, gules. Motto: Fortiter Fideliter Feliciter (Boldly, faithfully, successfully)	
2		Lord Lisgar		Escutcheon: Argent: three piles, sable, each charged with a trefoil, slipped, or, on a chief of the second, three annulets, of the third, and in canton the augmentation of a baronet being an inescutcheon, a sinister hand erect couped at the wrist and appaumé (open, displaying the palm) gules. Crest: A demi-lion rampant, charged on the shoulder with a trefoil, slipped, and holding in the dexter paw a sprig of three maple leaves, also slipped or. Supporters: Two women vested argent, the one to the dexter mantled azure and holding in her dexter hand a paddle or, the one to the sinister mantled vert and holding in her sinister hand a crook or. Coronet: That of a baron Motto: Prudentia (Prudence)	
3		Lord Dufferin		Escutcheon: Quarterly: 1st and 4th, azure, a fesse or, in chief a crescent, argent, between two mullets of the second, and in base a mascle voided of the third, Blackwood; 2nd quarterly, 1st and 4th or, an eagle displayed sable, 2nd and 3rd argent, two bars sable, each charged with three martlets, Temple; 3rd gules, three cinquefoils pierced ermine; on a chief or, a lion passant of the field, Hamilton. Crest: 1st, on a cap of maintenance, gules, turned up ermine, a crescent argent, Blackwood; 2nd, on a ducal coronet or, a martlet or; 3rd, a demi-antelope affronte ermine, attired and unguled or, holding between his hoofs a heart gules. Coronet: That of a marquess Supporters: Dexter, a lion gules, gorged with a collar, flory counterflory or; sinister, an heraldic tiger ermine, collared as the dexter. Motto: Per vias rectas (Straight forward)	
4		Lord Lorne		Escutcheon: Quarterly: 1st and 4th gyronny of eight or and sable, Campbell; 2nd and 3rd argent, a lymphad or ancient galley, sails furled, pennants flying and oars in action sable, Lorne. Crest: A boar's head fessewise, erased or, armed argent, langued gules. Coronet: That of a duke Supporters: Two lions rampant guardant, gules. Motto: Above: Ne obliviscaris (Forget not); on the compartment: Vix ea nostra voco (I scarce call these things our own)	
5		Marquess of Lansdowne		Escutcheon: Quarterly: 1st and 4th, ermine, on a bend azure, a magnetic needle pointing to the polar star or, Petty; 2nd and 3rd, argent, a saltire gules, and a chief ermine, Fitzmaurice. Crest: 1st, a bee-hive beset with bees, volante, all proper; 2nd, a sagittary passant proper. Coronet: That of a marquess Supporters: Two pegasi ermine, winged, bridled, and unguled, or, and each charged on the breast with a fleur-de-lis azure. Motto: Virtute non verbis (By courage, not words)	
6		Lord Stanley		Escutcheon: Argent, on a bend azure, three bucks' heads, cabossed or. Crest: On a chapeau gules, turned up ermine, an eagle wings extended or, preying on a child proper, swaddled gules, in a cradle laced or. Coronet: That of an earl Supporters: Dexter, a griffin, wings elevated, or, ducally collared, and line reflexed over the back azure; sinister, a stag or, collared and lined as the dexter. Motto:Sans changer (Without changing)	
7		Lord Aberdeen		Escutcheon: Azure, three boars’ heads couped or armed proper and langued gules, within a tressure flowered and counterflowered interchangeably with thistles, roses, and fleurs-de-lis of the second. Crest: Two arms holding a bow and arrow straight upwards in a shooting posture and at full draught all proper. Coronet: That of an marquess Supporters: Dexter, an earl; sinister, a doctor of laws. Motto: Fortuna sequatur (Let fortune follow)	
8		Lord Minto		Escutcheon: Quarterly: 1st and 4th grand quarters quarterly, 1st and 4th argent, a hunting horn sable, stringed gules, and on a chief azure, three mullets of the field, Murray; 2nd and 3rd azure, a chevron argent, between three fleurs-de-lis or, Kynynmound; 2nd and 3rd grand quarters gules, within a bordure vaire, a bend engrailed or, thereon a baton azure, Elliot; above all a chief of augmentation argent, and thereon a Moor's head sable, being the arms of the island of Corsica. Crest: A dexter arm embowed issuant from clouds, throwing a dart, all proper. Coronet: That of an earl Supporters: Dexter, an Indian sheep proper; sinister, a fawn proper. Motto: Over crest: Non eget arcu (He needs not the bow); Below: Suaviter et fortiter (Mildly and firmly)	
9		Lord Grey		Escutcheon: Gules, a lion rampant, within a bordure, engrailed, argent, in dexter chief point a mullet or. Crest: A scaling ladder, or, hooked and pointed sable. Coronet: That of an earl Supporters: Dexter, a lion guardant, purpure, ducally crowned, or; sinister, a tiger, guardant, proper. Motto: De bon vouloir servir le roy (To serve the king with good will) (Note: Alternatively, Debrett's (1903) gives the blazon as: Escutcheon: Quarterly: 1st and 4th gules, a lion rampant, within a bordure engrailed, argent; 2nd and 3rd, barry of six, argent and azure; a bend gules, charged with a bezant. Crest: A scaling ladder or. Supporters: Dexter, a lion guardant purpure, ducally crowned or; sinister, a tiger guardant, proper. Motto: De bon vouloir servir le roy (To serve the king with good will))	
10		Duke of Connaught		Escutcheon: The royal arms differenced by a label of three points argent, the centre point charged with a St George's Cross, and each of the other points with a fleur-de-lis azure; in the centre of the said royal arms, an escutcheon of the august house of Saxony, viz., barry of ten, or and sable, a crown of rue in bend vert. Coronet: That of a son of a sovereign Crest: On a coronet composed of crosses-patée, and fleur-de-lis, a lion statant guardant or, crowned with the like coronet, and differenced with a label of three points argent, charged as in the arms. Supporters: The royal supporters, differenced with the like coronet and label.	
11		Duke of Devonshire		Escutcheon: Sable, three bucks’ heads cabossed argent. Crest: A serpent nowed proper. Coronet: That of a duke Supporters: Two bucks proper, each wreathed round the neck with a chaplet of roses, alternately argent and azure. Motto: Cavendo tutus (Secure by caution)	
12		Lord Byng		Escutcheon: Quarterly sable and argent, in the first quarter a lion rampant of the second; over all in bend sinister, a representation of the Regimental colours of the 31st Regiment of Foot. Crest: 1st, out of a mural crown, an arm embowed, grasping the colours of the said regiment, and pendant from the wrist by a riband, a gold cross, and on an escroll, the word “Mouguerre”; 2nd, an heraldic antelope ermine, attired and crined or. Coronet: That of a viscount Supporters: Dexter, an heraldic antelope ermine, attired or; sinister, a lion or; each charged on the shoulder with a rose gules. Motto: Tuebor (I will defend)	
13		Lord Willingdon		Escutcheon: Quarterly: 1st and 4th argent, three lions rampant gules, a chief azure, Thomas, 2nd and 3rd ermine, two pallets azure, over all three fusils conjoined in fesse or, Freeman. Crest: 1st, a demi-lion rampant gules charged on the shoulder with an ermine spot argent, Thomas; 2nd, issuant out of an antique crown azure, a boar's head proper, Freeman. Coronet: That of a marquess Supporters: On either side a freeman armed cap-à-pie in English armour of the 17th century proper. Motto: Honesty is the best policy	
14		Lord Bessborough		Escutcheon: Gules, a chevron between three combs argent. Crest: Out of a ducal coronet azure, three arrows, points downward, one in pale and two in saltire, entwined at the intersection by a snake proper. Coronet: That of an earl Supporters: Two lions reguardant proper. Motto: Pro rege lege grege (For the king, the law and the people)	
15		Lord Tweedsmuir		Escutcheon: Azure, a fess argent between three lions' heads erased of the same. Crest: A sunflower proper. Coronet: That of a baron Supporters: Dexter: a stag proper attired or collared gules; Sinister: a falcon proper jessed belled and beaked or armed and collared gules. Motto: Non inferiora secutus (Not following meaner things).	
16		Lord Athlone		Escutcheon: Quarterly quartered, 1st grand quarter 1 and 4 England, 2 Scotland, 3 Ireland; in chief a label of three points argent, the centre point charged with a cross of St. George and each of the other points with two hearts in pale also gules; upon an escutcheon of pretence the arms of Hanover, gules, two lions passant guardant in pale or, impaling or semée of hearts gules, a lion rampant azure, on a point in point gules a horse courant; 2nd and 3rd grand quarters, party per pale, on the dexter side three stags attires fesseways in pale sable, on the sinister side three lions passant in pale sable, over all an inescutcheon of the arms of the Duchy of Teck, paly bendy sinister sable and argent; in the centre point a crescent for difference. Coronet: That of an earl Crest: A dog's head paly bendy sinister sable and argent, charged on the neck with a crescent for difference. Supporters: Dexter, a lion sable, the paws flayed to the shoulder gules; sinister, a stag proper; both charged on the shoulder with a crescent for difference. Motto: Fearless and faithful	
17		Lord Alexander		Escutcheon: Per pale argent and sable, a chevron, and in base a crescent, all counterchanged; on a canton azure a harp or stringed argent. Crest: An arm in armour, embowed, the hand holding a sword proper, hilt and pommel or. Coronet: That of an earl Supporters: Dexter, a piper of the Irish Guards holding under the interior arm a bagpipe; sinister, a sepoy of the 3rd/2nd Punjabi Regiment supporting with the exterior hand a rifle proper, each charged on the shoulder with an escutcheon barry nebuly of six argent and azure. Motto: By land, by sea, by the stars	
18		Vincent Massey		Escutcheon: Argent on a chevron between three lozenges sable each charged with a fleur-de-lis argent, three stags' heads erased or, a canton azure charged with the crest of the royal arms of Canada (on a wreath argent and gules a lion passant guardant or wearing the royal crown proper and holding in the dexter paw a maple leaf gules). Crest: Issuant from an antique crown or a bull's head sable armed or charged on the neck with a lozenge argent thereon a fleur-de-lis sable. Motto: Dum terar prosum (As long as I am wearing myself out, I am useful)	
19		General Georges Philias Vanier		Escutcheon: Or, on a chevron paly of eight azure and gules two swords, points in chief, or; in chief an oak tree couped proper between a fleur-de-lis azure and a trefoil vert and in base the gate of Citadel of Quebec flying thereon the flag of the Governor General of Canada proper. Crest: The steeple of the Church of St. Catherine at Honfleur in France or. Motto: Fiat voluntas dei (God's will be done)	
20		Roland Michener		Escutcheon: Azure four bendlets interlaced in saltire between in chief a representation of the royal crown of England and in base a fleur de lis or. Crest: In front of a demi-lion supporting a representation of the mace of the House of Commons of Canada or a plate charged with a maple leaf gules. Supporters: On the dexter side a deer gules attired and unguled or charged on the shoulder with a plate thereon a rose gules barbed and seeded proper and on the sinister side a deer argent attired and unguled or charged on the shoulder with a torteau thereon a square buckle argent. Motto: Libre et ordonné (Free and ordered)	
21		Jules Léger		Escutcheon: Bleu celeste in chief an owl affronty hovering argent in base a maple leaf ensigned by the royal crown both or.	
22		Edward Richard Schreyer		Escutcheon: Per pale or and vert a pale wavy of four azure and argent in chief a plate displaying a cross gules charged with the royal crown proper; in dexter base a pomeis charged with a garb or and in sinister base a bezant charged with a fir tree vert. Crest: A mound of ice proper thereon a polar bear statant argent supporting beneath its dexter paw a plate charged with a maple leaf gules. Supporters: Dexter a bison proper charged on the shoulder with a lozenge or bearing a prairie crocus flower slipped and leaved proper sinister a moose proper charged on the shoulder with a hurt displaying a fleur de lys or the whole set upon a compartment party per pale a wheatfield or and a forest vert. Motto: Freedom · Égalité · Justice · Arbeit · Знання · Dignità (Freedom, equality, justice, work, accomplishment, dignity)	
23		Jeanne Sauvé		Escutcheon: Azure the mace of the House of Commons of Canada or in bend between in chief an eagle displayed or bearing in its beak a bolt of lightning gules and in base a lion passant guardant or imperially crowned proper holding in the dexter paw a maple leaf gules fimbriated or. Crest: Within a circlet composed alternately of maple leaves gules and fleurs-de-lys or a dove wings elevated and addorsed holding in its beak a sprig of olive both proper. Supporters: On either side a doe proper each gorged with a collar argent pendant therefrom a roundel barry wavy argent and vert. Motto: Vis et tolerantia (Strength and tolerance)	
24		Ramon John Hnatyshyn		Escutcheon: Per fess bleu céleste and or in chief a lion passant guardant or royally crowned proper holding in its dexter paw a maple leaf gules fimbriated or in base a lion passant guardant bleu céleste holding in its dexter paw a heart gules. Crest: A demi lion gules charged on each shoulder with a maple leaf argent holding in its dexter forepaw scales of justice or. Supporters: Dexter a white tailed deer per fess bleu céleste and or armed and gorged with a collar all or pendant therefrom a bezant charged with a representation of the badge of the House of Commons of Canada proper, sinister a bull per fess bleu céleste and or gorged with a collar vert fimbriated argent pendant therefrom a prairie lily flower proper charged with the tryzub of Ukraine bleu céleste the whole set upon a compartment party per pale of trees of the boreal forest vert and a wheat field or rising above barry wavy azure and argent. Motto: Moderatio in omnibus (Moderation in all things)	
25		Roméo LeBlanc		Escutcheon: Argent on a pile gules the star of Acadia ensigned by a representation of the royal crown or. Crest: Four eagle feathers argent quilled or encircled with a band of Micmac porcupine quill decoration gules embellished with a barrulet dancetty argent. Supporters: Rising from a mound argent semé of maple leaves gules between waves of the sea azure crested argent two dolphins argent finned and tailed and gorged with a garland of fleurs-de-lys or and maple leaves gules pendant therefrom a hurt charged dexter with a steam locomotive wheel and sinister with a closed book or clasped gules. Motto: Semper amissos meminisse decet (It is proper to remember the ones who have been left behind)	
26		Adrienne Clarkson		Escutcheon: Gules a Chinese phoenix regarding a lightning flash and rising from flames issuant from a maple leaf the whole ensigned by a representation of the royal crown all or. Crest: A loon (Gavia immer) calling proper naiant within a circlet of trillium flowers argent seeded or. Supporters: Two tigers or and argent embellished sable each gorged with a ribbon gules, pendant therefrom a plate surmounted by a cross gules the whole upon rocks set with four wind-swept jack pines proper. Motto: Verum solum dicatur • Verum solum accipiatur (May only the truth be spoken, may only the truth be heard)	
27		Michaëlle Jean		Escutcheon: Sable a sand dollar ensigned by the royal crown or. Crest: A sea shell or entoured by a chain its ends broken sable. Supporters: Two simbis or queued and crined sable each sounding a sea shell or and issuant from barry wavy or and sable set before a rocky mound proper growing thereon to the dexter a palm tree and to the sinister a pine tree or. Motto: Briser les solitudes (Breaking down solitudes)	
28		David Johnston		Escutcheon: Argent fretty sable, on a chief gules the royal crown between two open books or. Crest: A candle argent enflamed and within a stand or flanked by four closed books their spines palewise, two gules and two or, all set on a closed book bound or its edge fesswise argent. Supporters: Two unicorns gules, armed, maned, tufted, unguled, each charged on the shoulder with an astrolabe, and standing on a grassy mount or set with two feet gules winged sable and in base a bar wavy sable inscribed with zeros and ones or. Motto: Contemplare meliora (To envisage a better world)	
29		Julie Payette		Escutcheon: Per pale azure and sable a wing and in the canton the royal crown argent. Crest: A musical stave bearing the first notes of the second movement of Alessandro Marcello's Oboe Concerto in D minor sable. Supporters: Two lynx sable embellished argent, each wearing a collar set with laurel leaves or and mullets argent, standing on the planet Earth azure, its atmosphere argent, charged with the Greek letter sigma (Σ) argent. Motto: Per aspera ad astra (Through hardship to the stars)	
30		Mary Simon		Escutcheon: Argent an annulet, overall a fess nowy azure charged with the royal crown argent. Crest: A snowy owl affronty wings displayed and inverted environed by caribou antlers proper. Supporters: Two arctic foxes proper each gorged of a collar azure pendent therefrom a hurt that to the dexter charged with a mountain sorrel flower, that to the sinister with a cinquefoil argent, each fox supporting a kakivak and standing on a rocky mount set with a blueberry patch and cottongrass flowers proper. Motto: ᐊᔪᐃᓐᓇᑕ • AJUINNATA (Let us persevere)	
31		Louise Arbour (Note: Current governor general.)	No arms known		

== See also ==
- List of governors general of Canada
- Canadian heraldry
- Arms of Canada
- Roll of arms
- Armorial of the governors-general of Australia
- Armorial of the governors-general of New Zealand
- Armorial of prime ministers of the United Kingdom
- Armorial of presidents of the United States
