= Armorial of the governors-general of Australia =

Badge of the governors-general of Australia

The following is an armorial of the individuals who have served as governor-general of the Commonwealth of Australia.

Several Australian governors-general have been granted armorial achievements, commonly referred to as coats of arms, with many having been inherited.

== Coats of arms of governors-general ==
No.	Portrait	Name	Arms	Blazon / Description	Full achievements
1		John Adrian Louis Hope, 7th Earl of Hopetoun (Note: The first governor-general of Australia.)		Escutcheon: Azure, on a chevron or, between three bezants, a laurel leaf, vert. Crest: A broken terrestrial globe, surmounted by a rainbow proper. Coronet: That of an earl Supporters: Two figures of “Hope” habited, proper, each resting the exterior hand on an anchor. Motto: At spes non fracta (But my hope is not broken)	
2		Hallam Tennyson, 2nd Baron Tennyson		Escutcheon: Gules, a bend nebuly or, thereon a chaplet vert, between three leopard's heads jessant-de-lys of the second. Crest: A dexter arm in armour, the hand in a gauntlet or, grasping a broken tilting spear enfiled with a garland of laurel. Coronet: That of a baron Supporters: Two leopards rampant guardant gules, semée de lys and ducally crowned or. Motto: Respiciens Prospiciens (Look backward and forward)	
3		Henry Stafford Northcote, 1st Baron Northcote		Escutcheon: Argent, three cross-crosslets in bend sable, a crescent for difference. Crest: Upon a chapeau gules, turned-up ermine, a stag trippant argent, charged on the shoulder with a crescent for difference. Coronet: That of a baron Supporters: Two stags proper, pendant from the neck of each by a gold chain an escutcheon ermine, thereon a pine cone or, and charged on the shoulder with a crescent for difference. Motto: Christi crux est mea lux (The cross of Christ is my light)	
4		William Humble Ward, 2nd Earl of Dudley		Escutcheon: Chequy, or and azure, a bend ermine. Crest: Out of a ducal coronet or, a lion's head azure. Coronet: That of an earl Supporters: Two angels proper, hair and wings or, under robe sanguine, upper robe azure. Motto: Comme je fus (As I was)	
5		Thomas Denman, 3rd Baron Denman		Escutcheon: Argent, on a chevron between three lions' heads erased gules, as many ermine spots or. Crest: A raven rising proper, in the beak an annulet or. Coronet: That of a baron Supporters: On either side a lion gules, charged on the body with five ermine spots in cross or. Motto: Prudentia Et Constantia (By prudence and constancy)	
6		Sir Ronald Craufurd Munro-Ferguson		Escutcheon: Argent, a lion rampant azure, between three buckles gules, a chief chequy of the first and second. Crest: A demi-lion proper holding between the paws a buckle gules. Coronet: That of a viscount Supporters: Dexter, an emu, sinister, an eagle, both proper. Motto: Virtutis fortuna comes (Fortune is the companion of virtue)	
7		Henry William Forster, 1st Baron Forster		Escutcheon: Argent, on a chevron between three hunting horns sable a martlet or. Crest: A dexter arm in armour embowed grasping in the hand a broken tilting lance or, the rerebrace charged with a cross pattée sable. Coronet: That of a baron Supporters: Dexter, a 2nd lieutenant, of the King's Royal Rifle Corps; sinister, a lieutenant, of the 2nd Dragoons (Royal Scots Greys); both proper. Motto: Fide et fortitudine (By fidelity and fortitude)	
8		John Lawrence Baird, 1st Baron of Stonehaven		Escutcheon: Per pale engrailed gules and or, a boar passant counterchanged. Crest: A griffin's head erased or. Coronet: That of a baron Supporters: Two griffins, wings expanded or, each holding in its interior claw a thistle slipped proper. Motto: Dominus fecit (The Lord did it)	
9		Sir Isaac Alfred Isaacs	No arms known		
10		Sir Alexander Gore Arkwright Hore-Ruthven, 1st Earl of Gowrie		Escutcheon: Paly of six argent and gules. Crest: A ram's head couped sable, armed or. Coronet: That of an earl Supporters: Two goats sable, armed, unguled and ducally gorged Or, with chains also or reflexed over the back. Motto: Deid schaw (Show a deed)	
11		Prince Henry, Duke of Gloucester		The royal arms, differenced with a label of three points argent, the centre bearing a lion rampant gules, and the outer points crosses gules.	
12		Sir William John McKell	No arms known		
13		Field Marshal Sir William Joseph Slim, 1st Viscount Slim		Escutcheon: Gules semée of swords erect argent a lion rampant or, on a canton quarterly azure and also argent a mullet of seven points or. Coronet: That of a viscount Crest: Out of a crown vallary or a peacock in its pride proper gorged with a collar and with a line reflexed over the back or. Motto: Merses Profundo Pulchrior Evenit (A recompense is fairer from a depth)	
14		William Shepherd Morrison, 1st Viscount Dunrossil	Outside Scotland:	Escutcheon: Azure on a pale ermine between two gannets reversed volant to the dexter their wings expanded palewise proper a representation of the mace of the House of Commons or. Coronet: That of a viscount Crest: A viking galley with one mast and sail furled proper flying from the masthead a pennon argent charged with a raven volant sable. Motto: An Tighnearna Mo Bhuachaille (The Lord is my Shepherd)	
14		William Shepherd Morrison, 1st Viscount Dunrossil	In Scotland:	Escutcheon: Per bend sinister gules and argent a demi-lion rampant issuant or armed and langued azure holding in his paws a battle axe the shaft curved of the third and the axehead of the fourth in chief and in base issuant from the sea undy vert and or a tower sable windows and port or over all a bend sinister embattled azure charged with an open crown or jewelled gules between two fleurs-de-lis argent; within a bordure vert for difference. Crest: Issuant from waves of the sea azure crested argent a mount vert thereon an embattled wall azure masoned argent charged with a portcullis or and issuant therefrom a cubit arm naked proper the hand grasping a dagger azure hilted or. Coronet: That of a viscount Supporters: On either side a lion regardant or armed and langued gules collared vert supporting between the exterior forepaw and interior hindpaw a battleaxe azure the shaft embowed. Mottos: Above the Crest: Teaghlach Phabbay (Pabbay family); Below the Shield: An Tighnearna Mo Bhuachaille (The Lord is my Shepherd)	
15		William Phillip Sidney, 1st Viscount De L'Isle		Escutcheon: Or, a pheon azure. Crest: A porcupine statant azure quilled, collared and chained or. Coronet: That of a viscount Supporters: Dexter, a porcupine azure quilled, collared and chained or; sinister, a lion double queued vert. Motto: Quo fata vocant (Whither the Fates call me)	
16		Richard Gardiner Casey, Baron Casey		Escutcheon: Per chevron sable and azure in chief a cogwheel and sun in splendour or in base above four barrulets wavy a representation of the constellation of the Southern Cross argent. Crest: A sea gull wings expanded proper. Coronet: That of a baron Supporters: Dexter an Australian worker of European stock habited in a white shirt and khaki trousers, sinister an Asian worker habited in a white coat and dhoti all Proper. Motto: Vis Et Unitas (Strength And Unity)	
17		Sir Paul Meernaa Caedwalla Hasluck		Escutcheon: Per pale and per chevron or and azure three catherine wheels within a bordure all counterchanged. Crest: On a wreath of the colours, in front of a star of seven points or a blackboy (Xanthorrhoea) flowered sable. Supporters: On the dexter side an Australian pelican (Pelicanus conspicillatus) and on the sinister side a Western Australian pied cormorant (Phalacrocorax varius) proper.	
18		Sir John Robert Kerr		Escutcheon: Ermine a mimosa flower ensigned with the Royal Crown proper on a chief gules a heart or between two pierced mullets of seven points argent. Crest: A wedge-tailed eagle and a bird-of-paradise respectant proper supporting a sword point upward argent hilt and pommel or. Supporters: On the dexter side a unicorn argent crined and unguled or and on the sinister side a griffin also or each supporting a sword point downwards argent hilt and pommel or. Motto: Independence under law	
19		Sir Zelman Cowen	No arms known		
20		Sir Ninian Stephen		Escutcheon: Argent a fess azure between three thistle flowers slipped each between and conjoined to two sprays of wattle flowered and leaved all proper six ermine tails semy gold. Crest: An Australian king parrot proper upon a branch of eucalyptus also proper.	
21		William George Hayden	No arms known		
22		Sir William Patrick Deane		Escutcheon: Argent a lion sejant affronty azure armed and langued gules holding in its dexter paw a trefoil slipped vert and in the sinister paw a sprig of wattle proper. On a chief of the second three dove's wings of the first. Crest: A lion's gamb in pale erased azure holding a scale in balance or. Supporters: Two lions rampant guardant azure armed and langued gules imperially crowned proper each charged on the shoulder with a trefoil slipped or. Motto: Fides Et Lex	
23		Peter Hollingworth	No arms known		
24		Major General Michael Jeffery	No arms known		
25		Dame Quentin Bryce	No arms known		
26		General Sir Peter Cosgrove	No arms known		
27		General David John Hurley		A coat of arms was created for David Hurley in his capacity as Governor of New South Wales in 2019, prior to becoming Governor General. The shield of Hurley's coat of arms is white with a red cross charged with 5 gold Harrington knots (for Hurley). In the corners of the shield, clockwise from top left to bottom left, are depictions of a gold star, a red cross, the rising sun badge of the Australian Army, and a waratah. Behind the shield are depictions of the star of the Order of Saint John and the blue enamel ring from the badge of a Companion of the Order of Australia For the crest there is a red rabbit with a green tail (for the South Sydney Rabbitohs) holding a golden treble clef. The supporters are a platypus and a kookaburra, the State mammal and State bird of New South Wales, respectively. Motto: Duty First	Link to file
28		Sam Mostyn (Note: Current governor general.)	No arms known		

== See also ==
- List of governors-general of Australia
- Australian heraldry
- Coat of arms of Australia
- Roll of arms
- Armorial of the governors-general of New Zealand
- Armorial of the governors general of Canada
- Armorial of prime ministers of the United Kingdom
- Armorial of presidents of the United States
