= Quadrate (heraldry) =

In heraldry, an ordinary is described as quadrate (or more fully, nowy quadrate), when it has a square central boss.

Cross quadrate argent

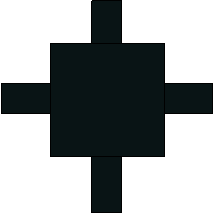
Cross quadrate sable

Cross quadrate gammadion

Saltire quadrate

St. Chad cross

Cross paty quadrate

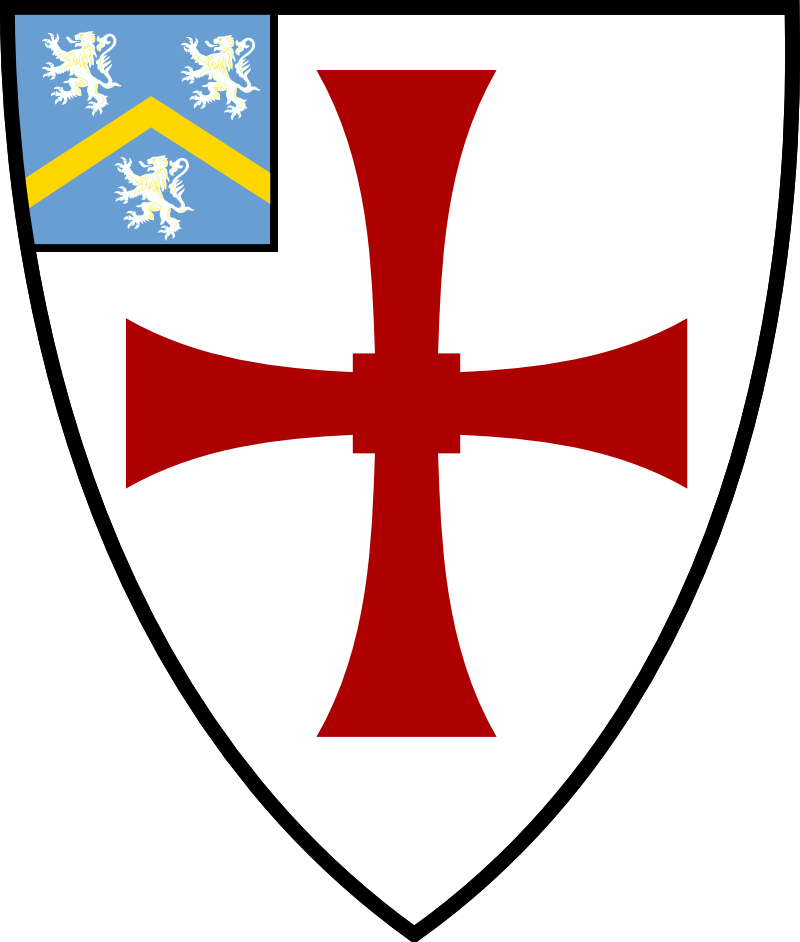
Shield of Durham University: Argent, a cross paty quadrate gules; on a canton azure a chevron or between three lions rampant argent.

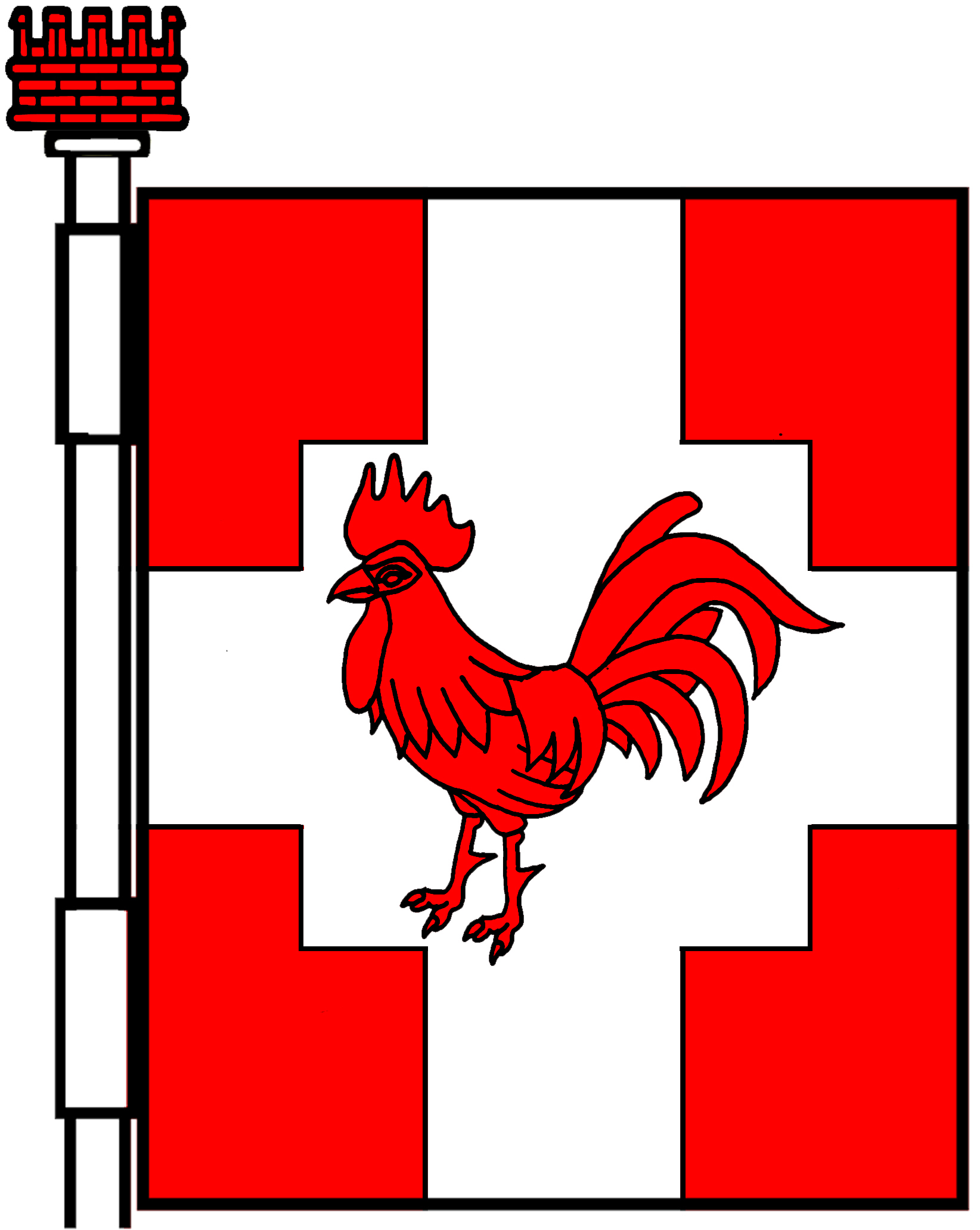
Banner of the Burgh of Markinch, Scotland: Gules, on a cross nowy quadrate argent a cock gules.

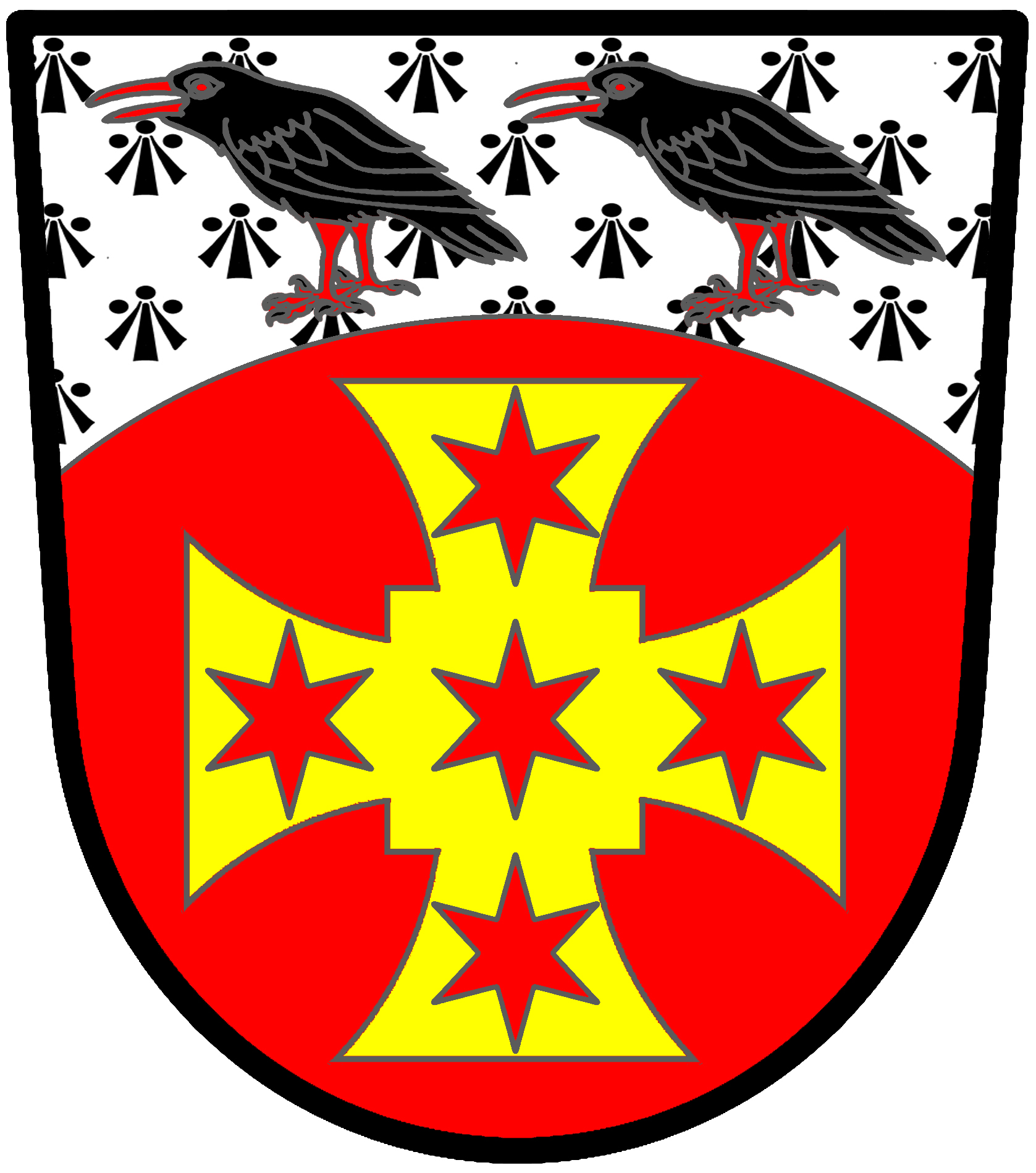
Gules, a cross paty quadrate or, charged with five mullets of six points gules: a chief arched ermine charged with two Cornish choughs proper - Vickers, England

Only certain ordinaries are usually shown quadrate: the cross, the pale, and the fess – but not, for example, a bordure or chevron.

A saltire quadrate has the square lozengeways:

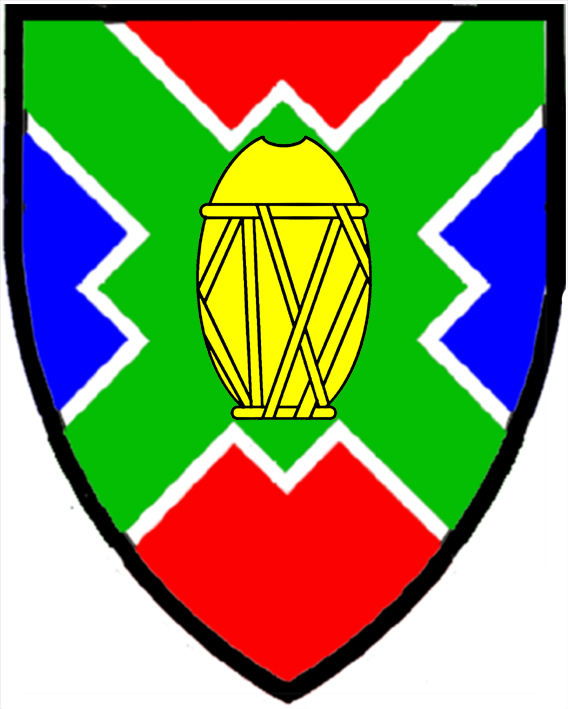
Arms of North West Province, South Africa: Per saltire gules and azure, a saltire quadrate vert, fimbriated argent.
