= Variations of ordinaries =

Ordinaries in heraldry are sometimes embellished with stripes of colour alongside them, have lumps added to them, shown with their edges arciform instead of straight, have their peaks and tops chopped off, pushed up and down out of the usual positions, or even broken apart.

== Cottices ==
Cottices, also spelled cottises, cotises, cotices, cotizes, are narrow stripes beside and parallel to an ordinary.

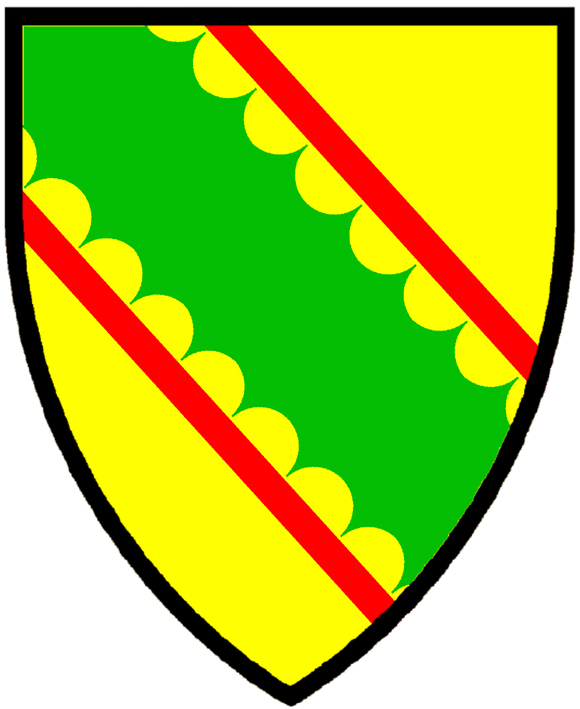
Cottises have plain edges unless specified. Or, a bend engrailed vert, cotticed gules; another example

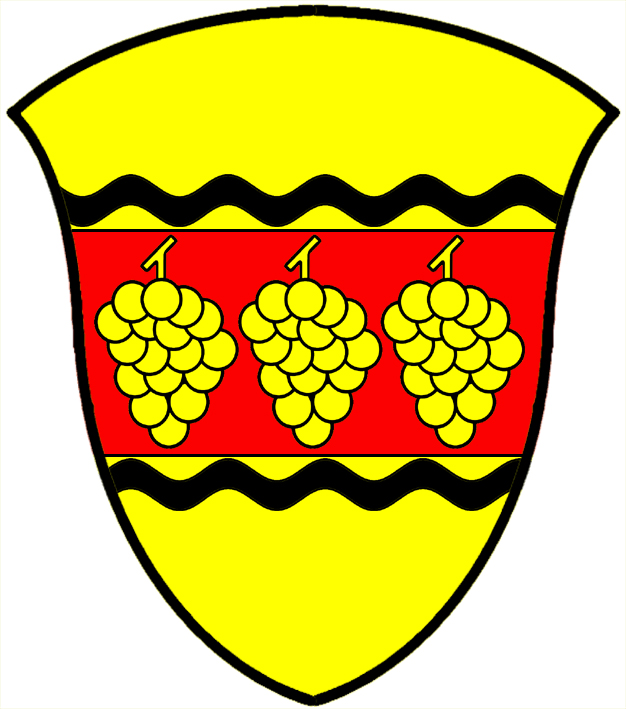
Here the ordinary's edges are straight and the cottice's not. Or, on a fess gules between two cottises wavy sable, three bunches of grapes or. Further examples: , ,

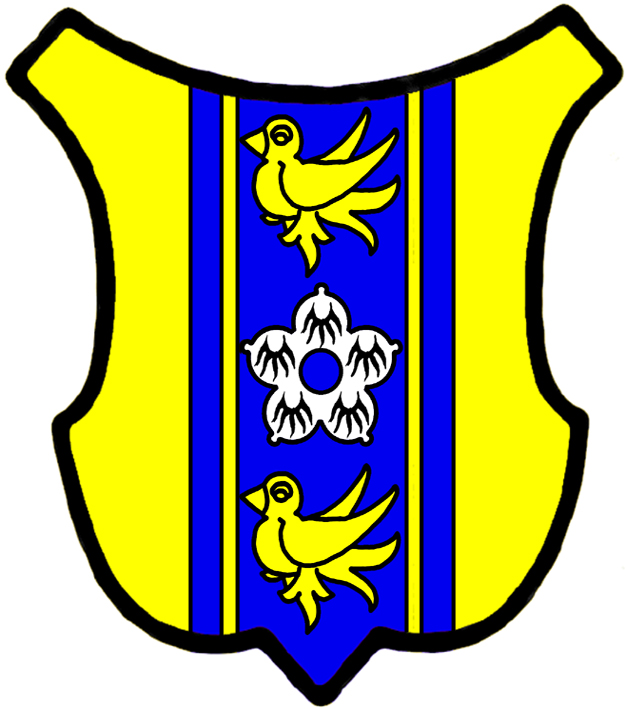
A pale so accompanied is often blazoned as endorsed. Or, on a pale endorsed azure, a cinquefoil pierced ermine between two martlets or.

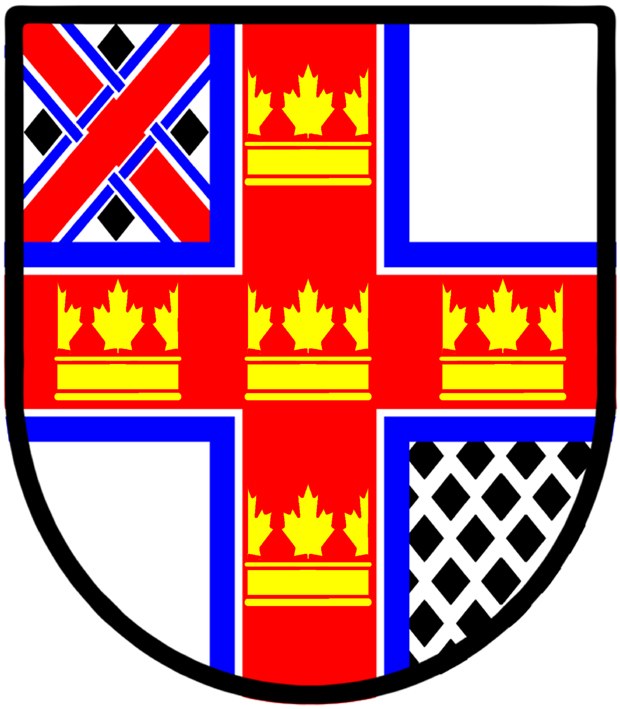
Argent, on a cross gules, cottised azure, five coronets erablé or; in the first quarter, a cross saltire gules, cottised interlaced azure, cantoned by four lozenges sable, the fourth quarter semy of lozenges sable. Another example

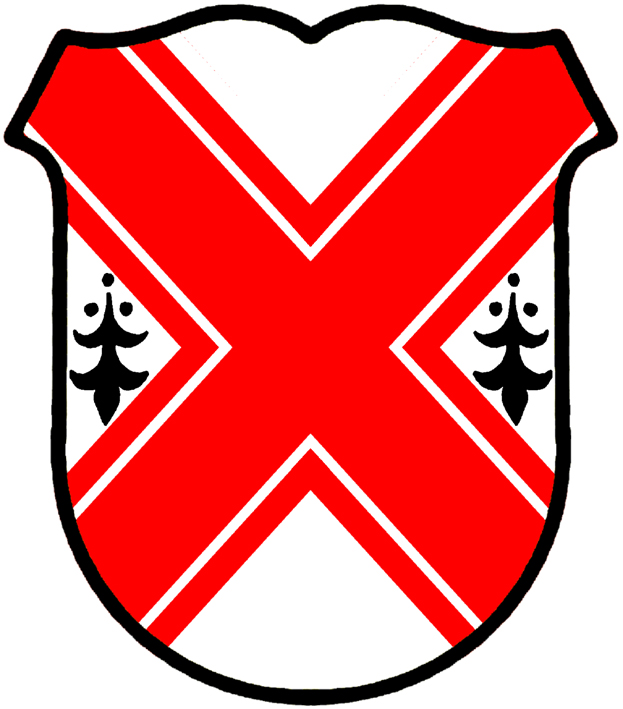
Argent, a saltire cottised gules, between two ermine spots in fess

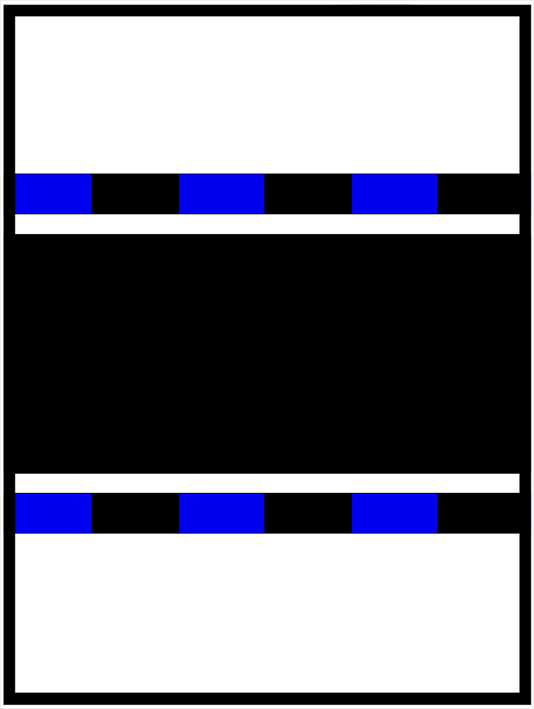
Cottices can take fancy colourings. Argent, a fess sable between two cottises compony azure and sable

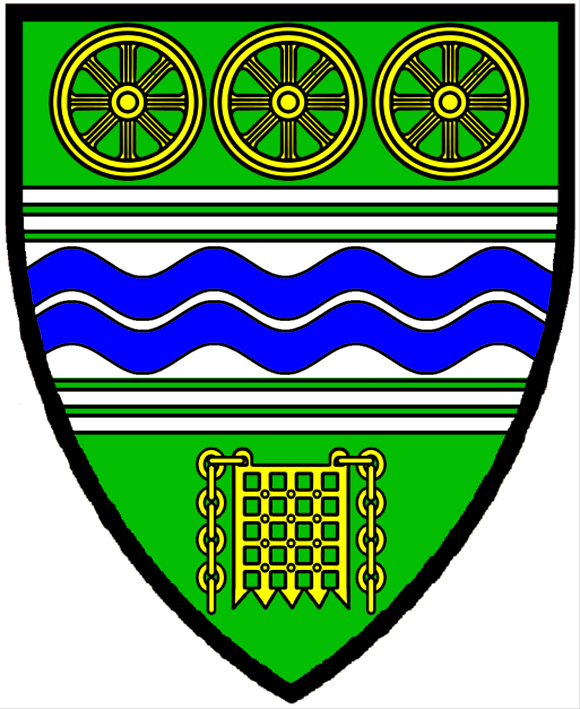
Cottices can be doubled. Vert, on a fess doubly cottised argent, two bars wavy azure, between in chief three railway wheels and in base a portcullis of the second chained or

Cottices can take exotic line variations and even charge-like shapes.

Per fess sable and Or, a fess per fess between two cotises their outer edges in the form of the upper rim of a Ducal Coronet all counterchanged.

Double cottices "potented and counter potented," (...)côtoyée de deux doubles cotices potencées et contre-potencées

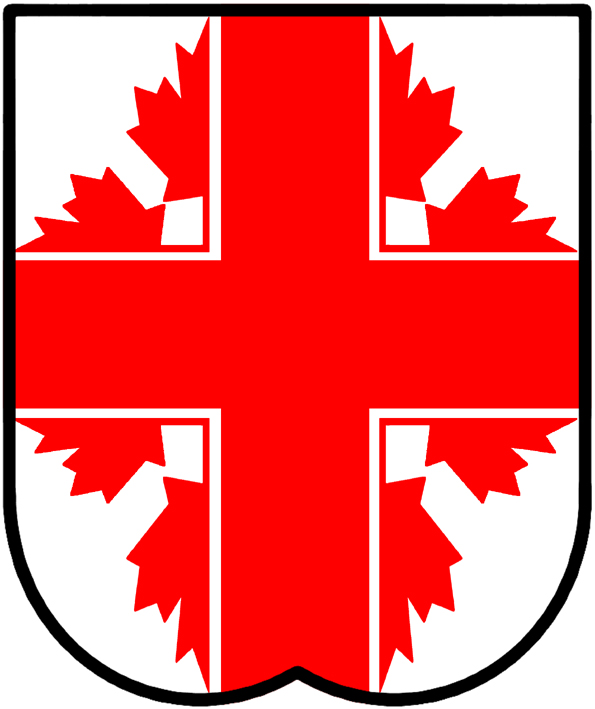
Argent, a cross cottised by eight demi maple leaves, stalks inwards, gules

== Nowy ==
An ordinary with a circular boss in the middle is described as nowy.

An ordinary with a square boss is called quadrate or, more fully, nowy quadrate. A saltire quadrate has the square boss turned lozengeways, with edges parallel to those of the saltire. An ordinary with a lozenge-shaped boss is called nowy lozengy or nowy of a lozenge (applies also to saltires)

Nowy and quadrate are usually applied only to the cross, saltire, pale, fess and bend.

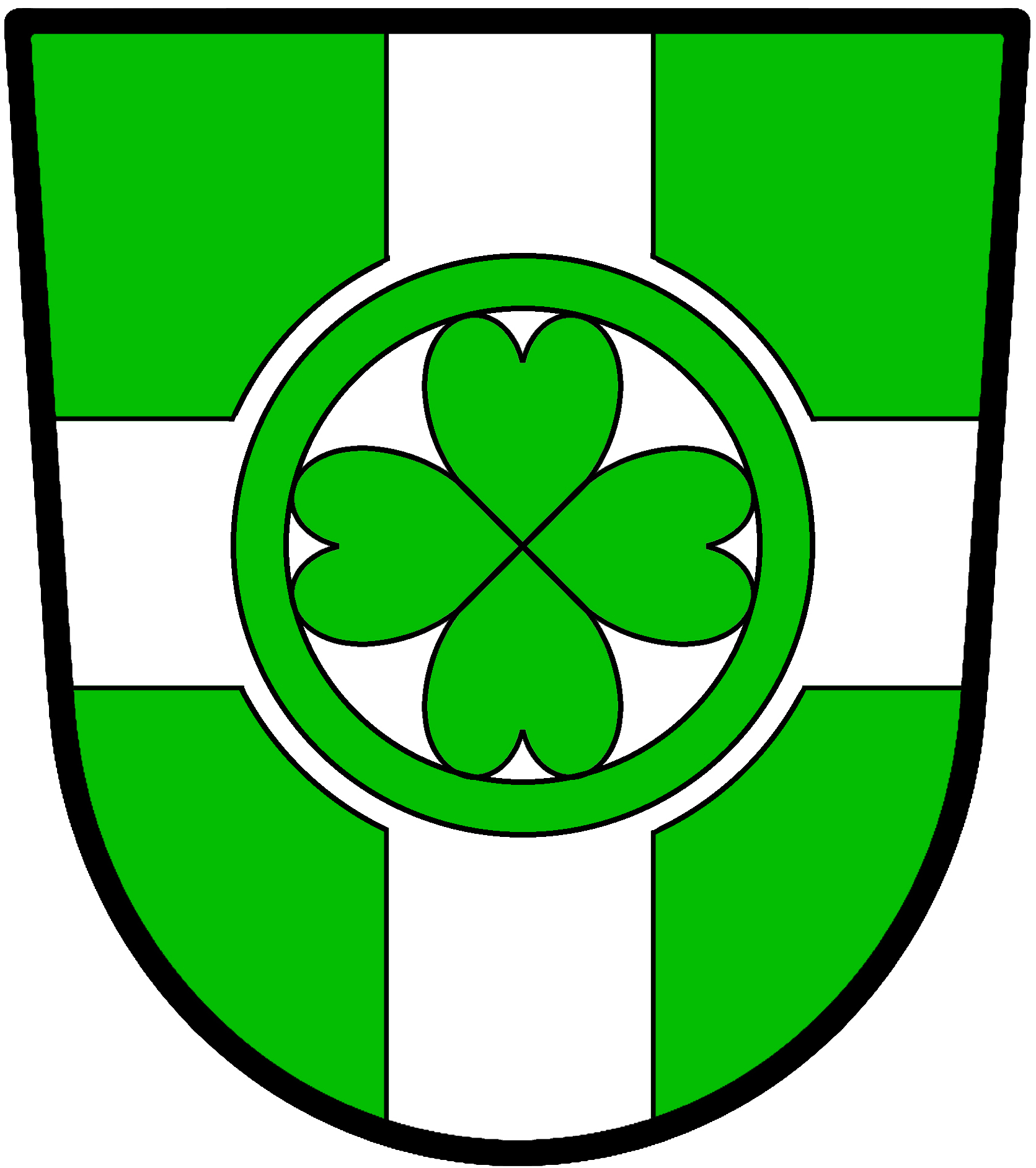
a cross nowy - Vert; a cross nowy, argent, charged with four hearts their points conjoined, within an annulet, vert - City of Chilliwack, Canada

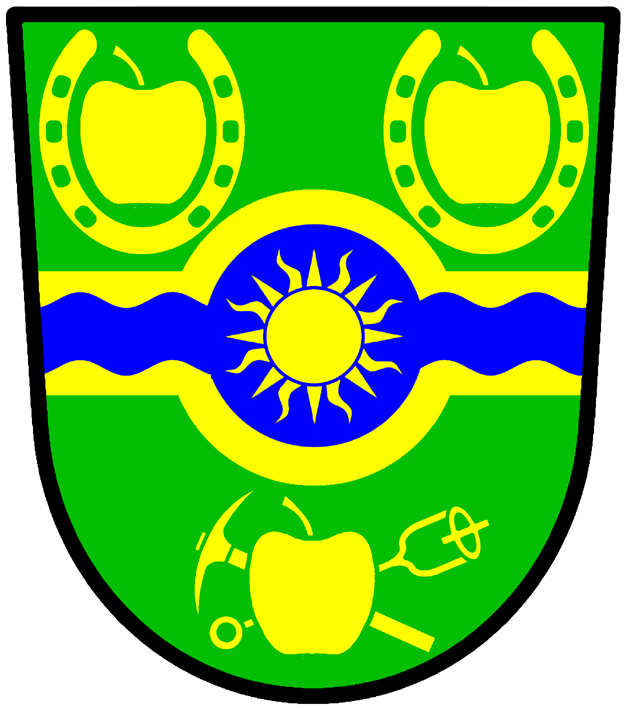
a fess nowy - Vert on a fess nowy ... a bar wavy nowy azure charged with a sun in splendour or - Town of Oliver, Canada

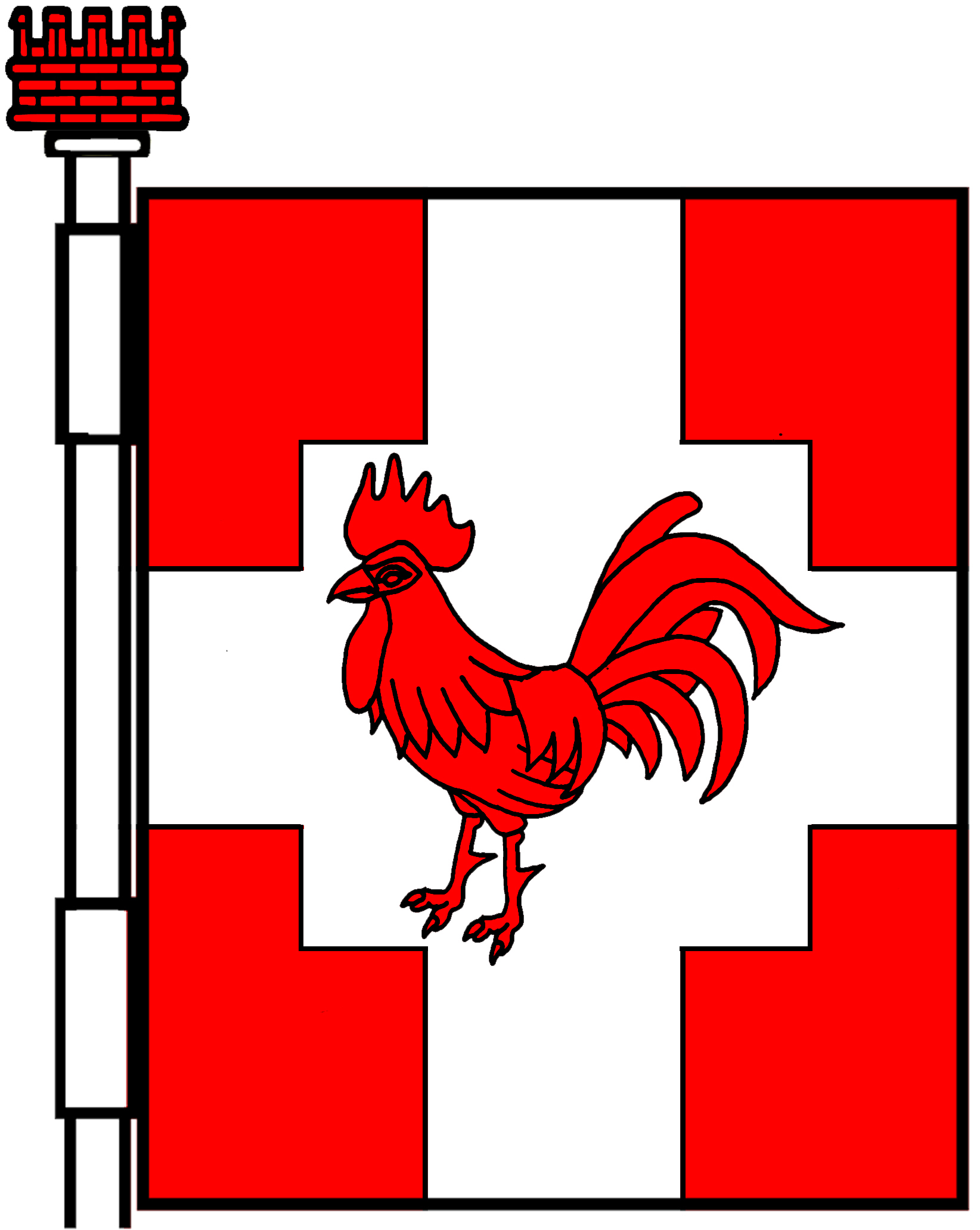
a cross quadrate - Gules; on a cross nowy quadrate, argent, a cock gules - Burgh of Markinch, Scotland

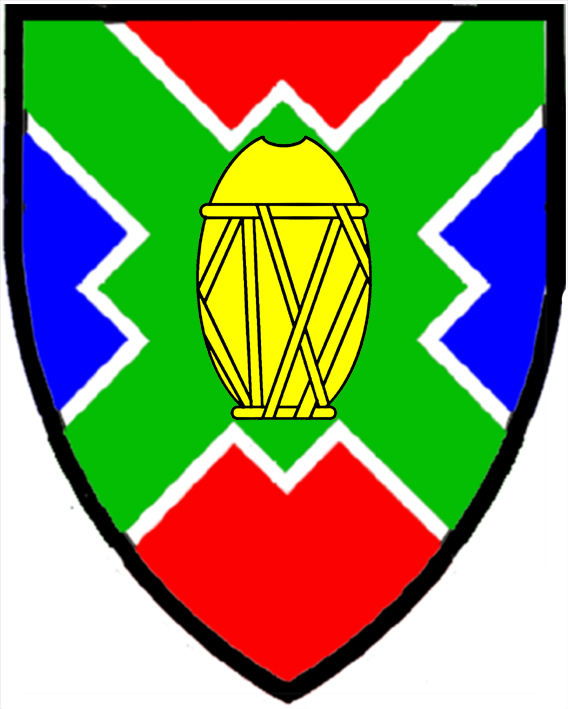
a saltire quadrate - Per saltire gules and azure; a saltire quadrate vert, fimbriated argent, charged in the centre ... - North West Province, South Africa

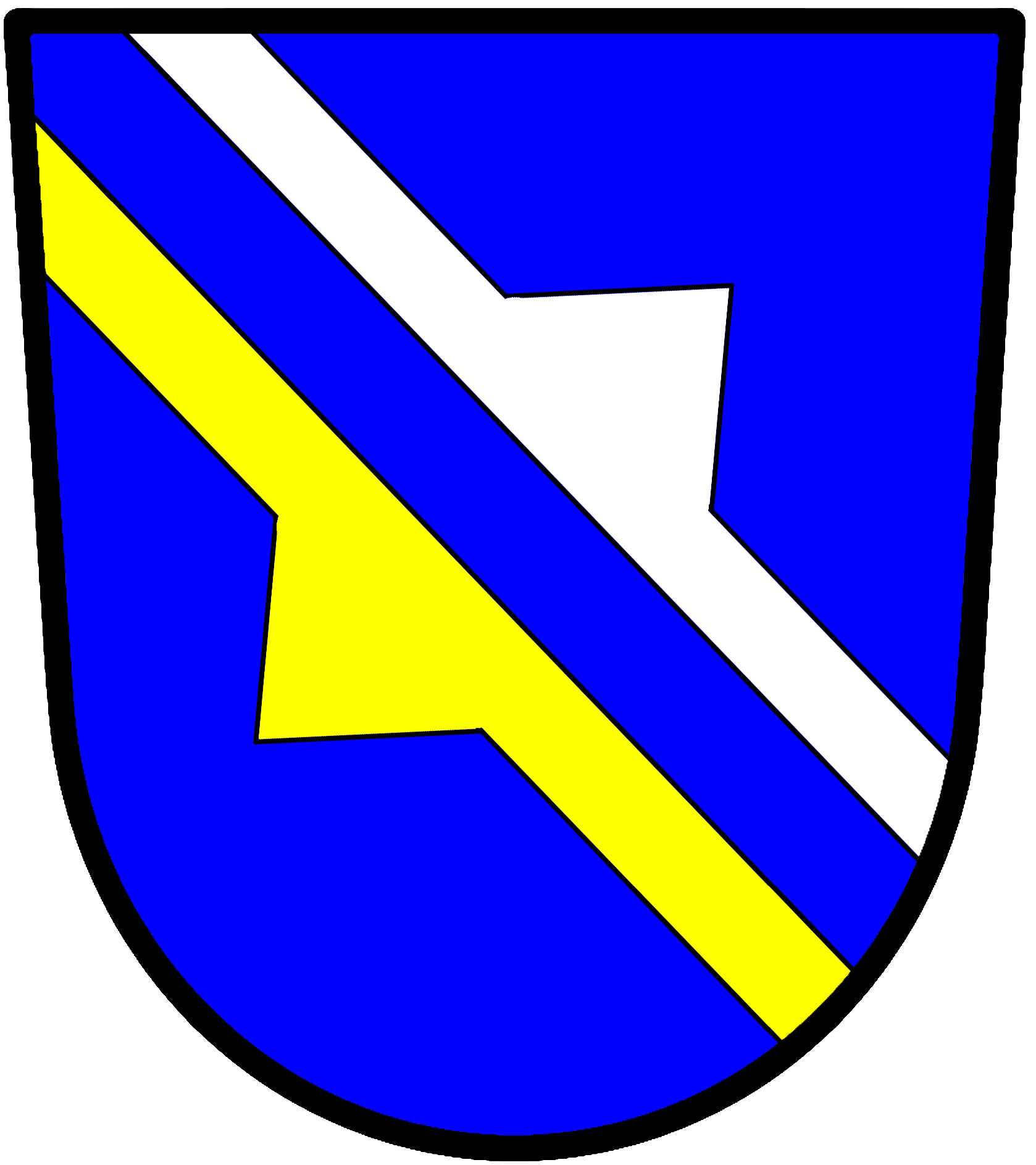
a bend nowy lozengy - Azure, on a bend nowy lozengy, per bend argent and or, a bendlet azure - Gould, England

== Facetting ==
An ordinary, perhaps especially a cross, might, like diamonds and mullets, be facetted, but examples of facetted ordinaries in actual heraldry are extremely hard to find.

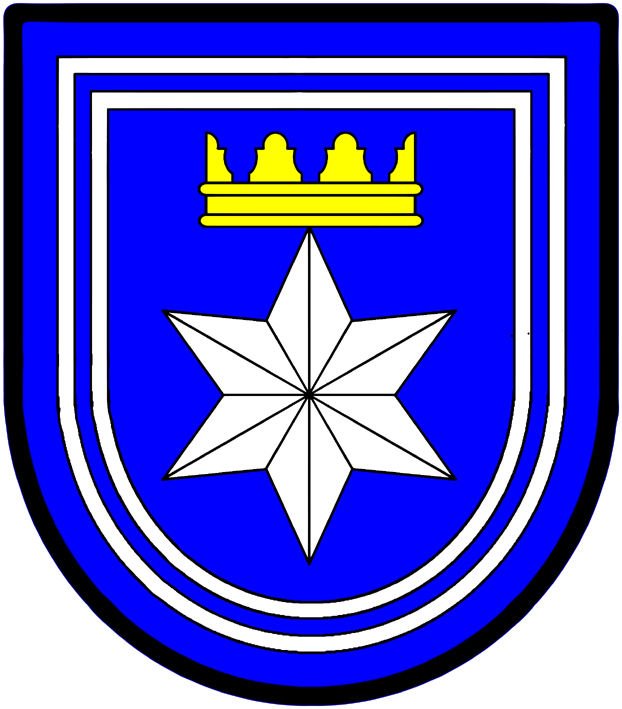
a mullet facetted - Azure; a facetted six pointed star [mullet] argent ensigned with a gable crown or, the whole within a double tressure argent - Landenhoven, South Africa

== Embowed ==
An ordinary embowed has the edges bowed inwards producing a concavity; this is sometimes more explicitly blazoned inwardly embowed. Its opposite is enarched.

This variation is most often applied to the chevron and pile.

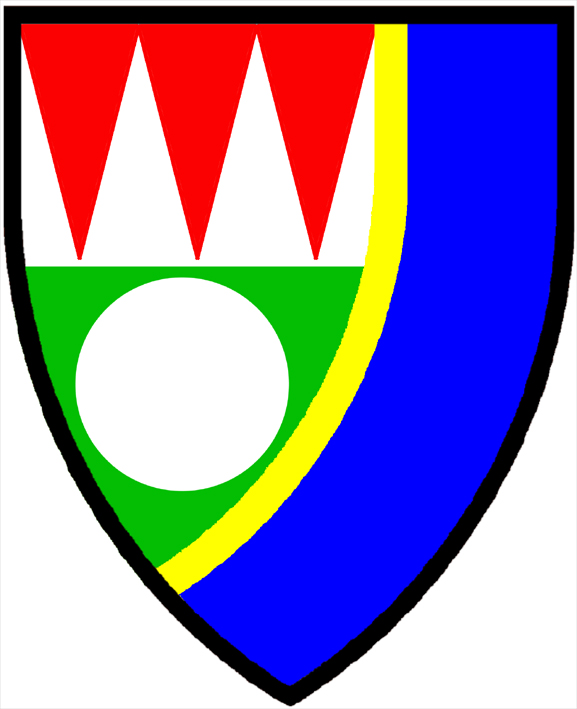
a flank to the base embowed - Per fess argent and vert; three piles, issuing from the chief, gules, in chief, and in base a plate; a sinister flank to the base embowed azure and fimbriated or - Deeside Golf Club

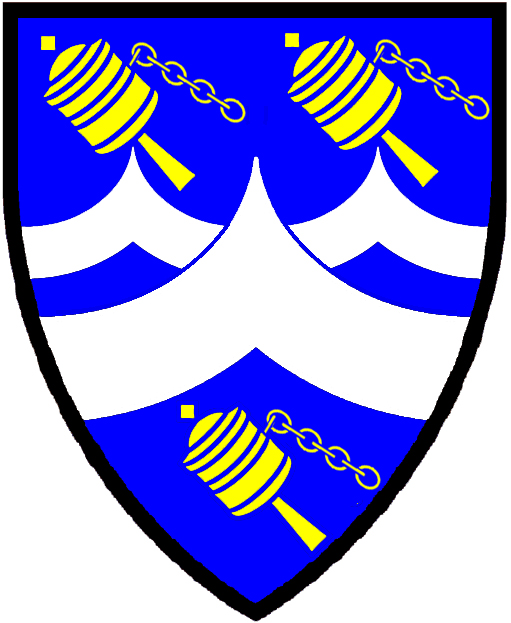
a chevron embowed - Azure; a chevron embowed between two chevronels embowed in fess, argent, all between three prayer wheels bendwise or - Hilary, New Zealand

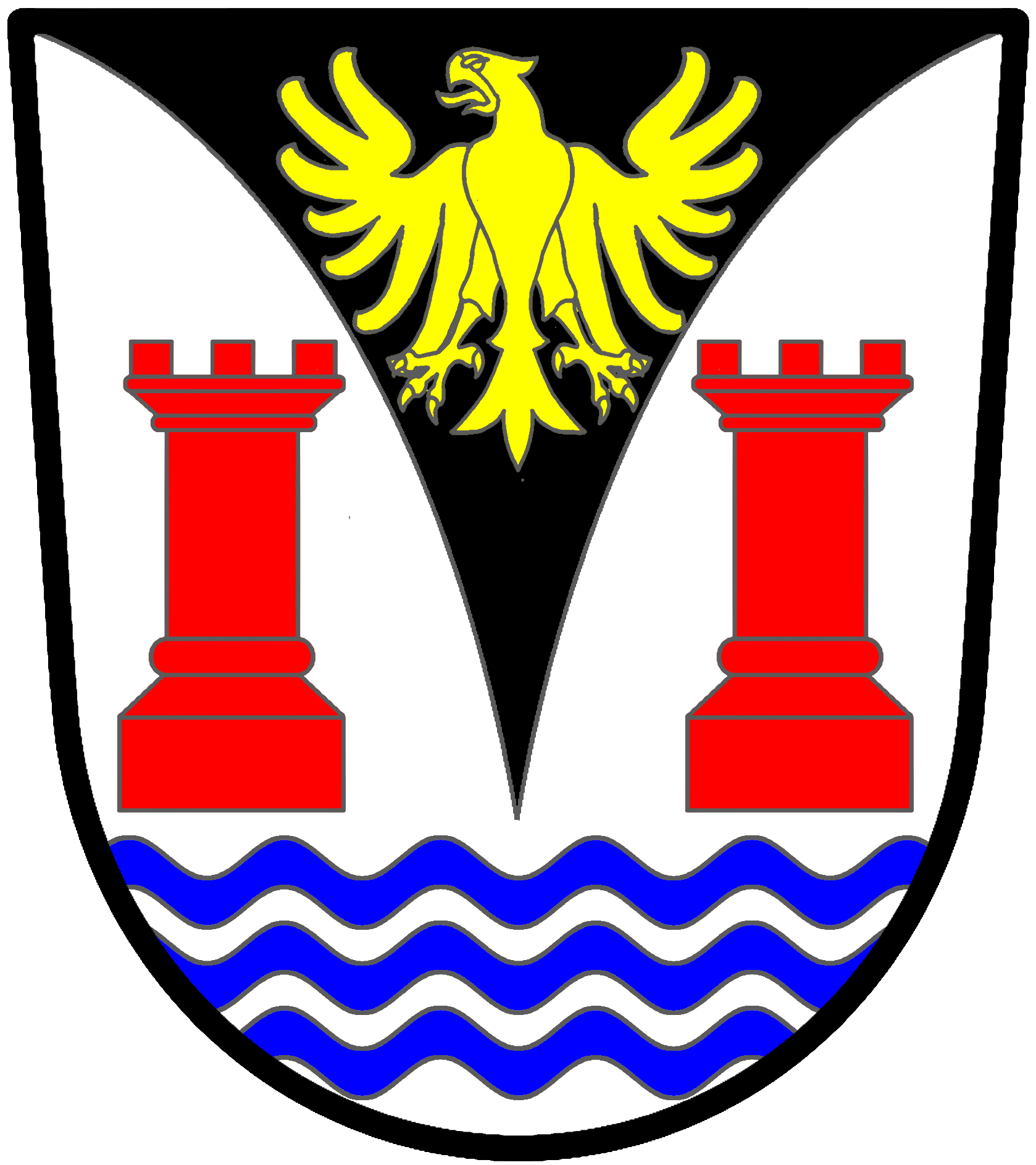
a pile embowed - Argent, on a pile embowed sable, between two towers gules and in base three barrulets wavy azure, an eagle displayed or - West Coast Peninsula Transitional Council, RSA

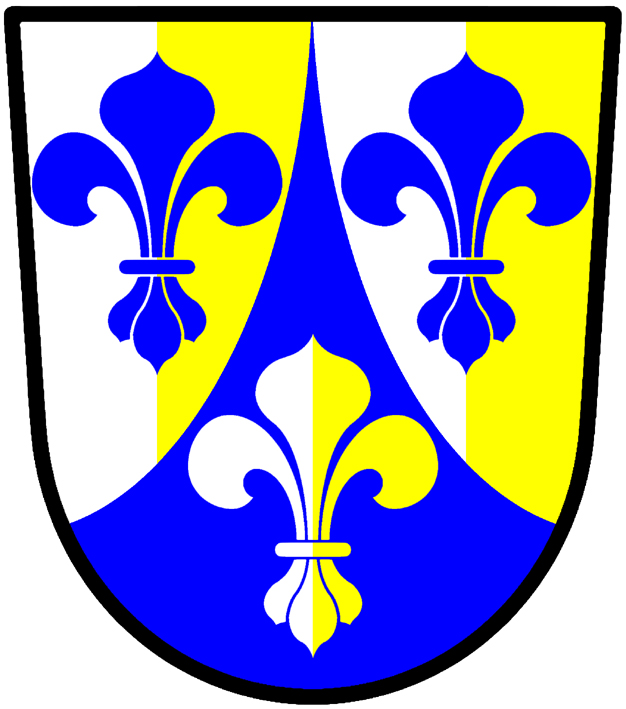
a pile inverted embowed - Paly of four argent and or; issuing in base a pile throughout the sides embowed inwards azure, over all three fleurs de lys, those in chief azure and that in base per pale argent and or - Norton, England

The term embowed is also applied to bent arms and legs, arched fish, and serpents in circles.

== Ecimé and other modified chevrons ==
The chevron ecimé has its peak "blunted", i.e. squared off rather than meeting in a point. Much more common is couped at the peak (or point) or even truncated. In the Canadian Public Register truncated is used in the Anglophone versions of blazons, and ecimé in the Francophone ones.

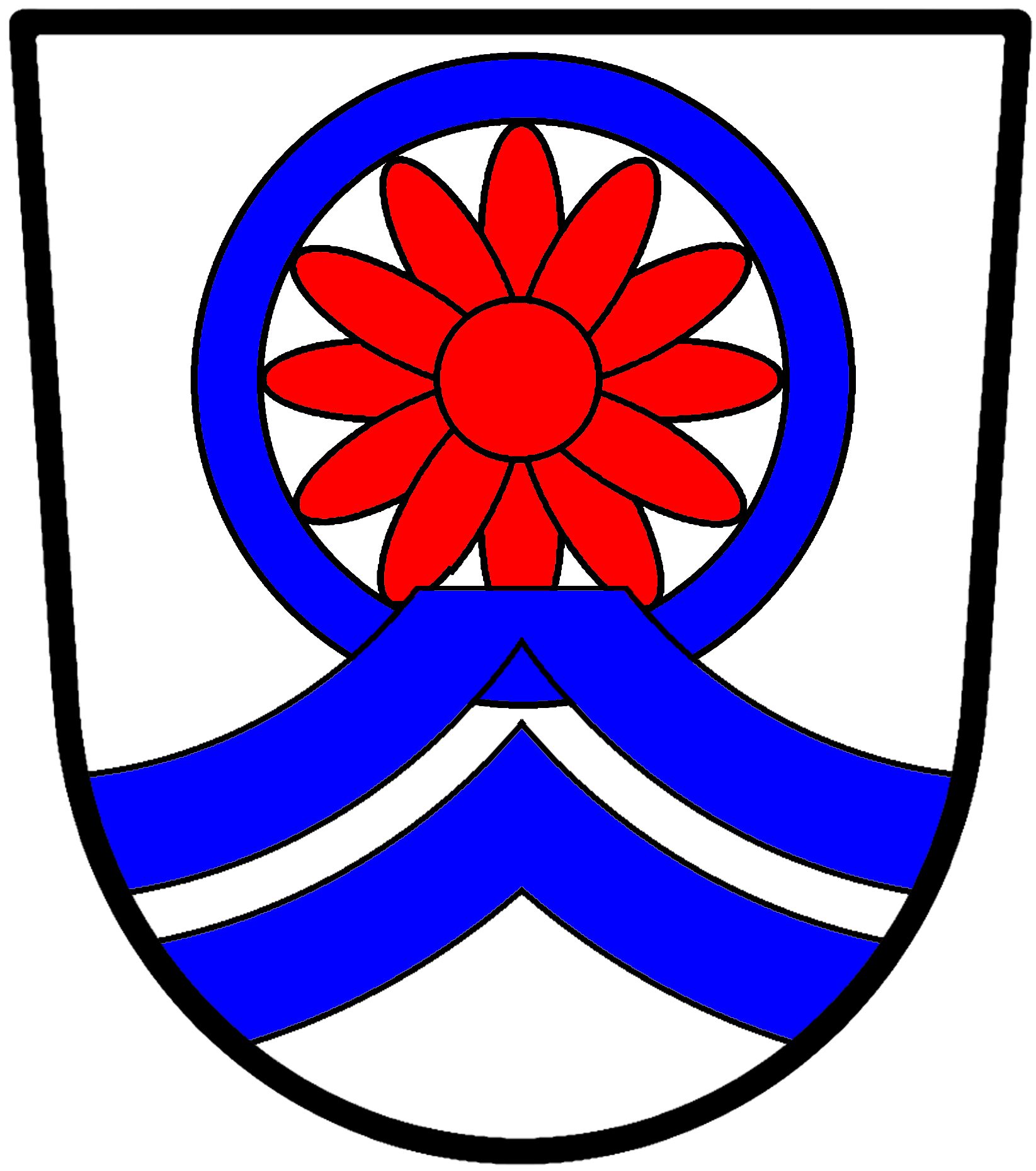
a chevron ecimé - Argent, at honour point a daisy gules within an annulet, over all a chevron ecimé embowed, in base a chevron embowed azure - Bergsigskool, RSA

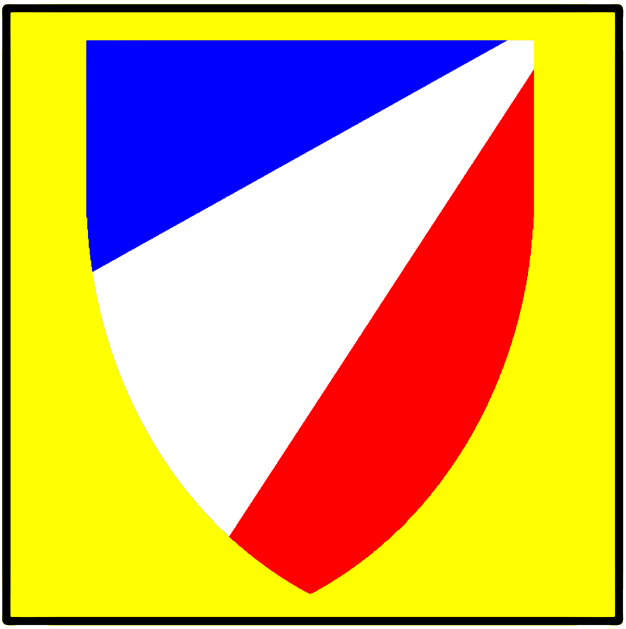
truncated vs écimée - On a square Or an escutcheon per bend sinister Azure and Gules charged with a pile reversed issuant from the dexter flank and truncated in the sinister chief Argent; Un carré d'or chargé d'un écusson taillé d'azur sur gueules à la pointe d'argent mouvante du flanc inférieur dextre, écimée en chef

The chevron disjointed or disjoined has the central, pointed portion missing.[5] The chevron éclaté has each end with roughly-made points or spikes on it.[6]. The chevron brisy (or brisé) as in the Scots Public Register, vol 52, p54 also has the point part removed though in this case the two remaining sections are squared off and 'lean' against each other, as can be seen in the French coat of Meaudre de la Pouyade.[7]

The Armorial de Gelre shows Bernard v.d. Wilten as bearing a "fasce palissée" (similar to a fess embattled with long merlons and the ends rounded).

== Enhanced and abased ==
An ordinary enhanced is placed higher in the field than its usual position.

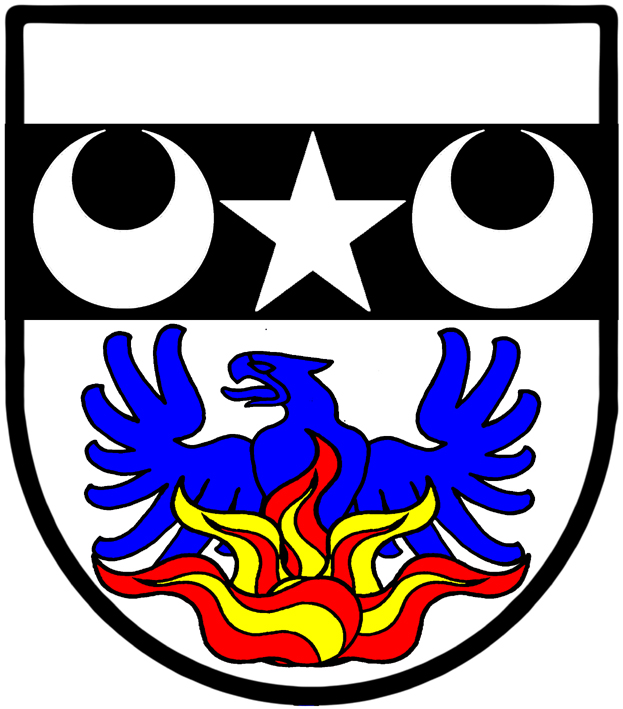
a fess enhanced - Argent; on a fess enhanced sable, a mullet between two crescents argent and in base a phoenix azure, in flames proper - Blaine, Scotland

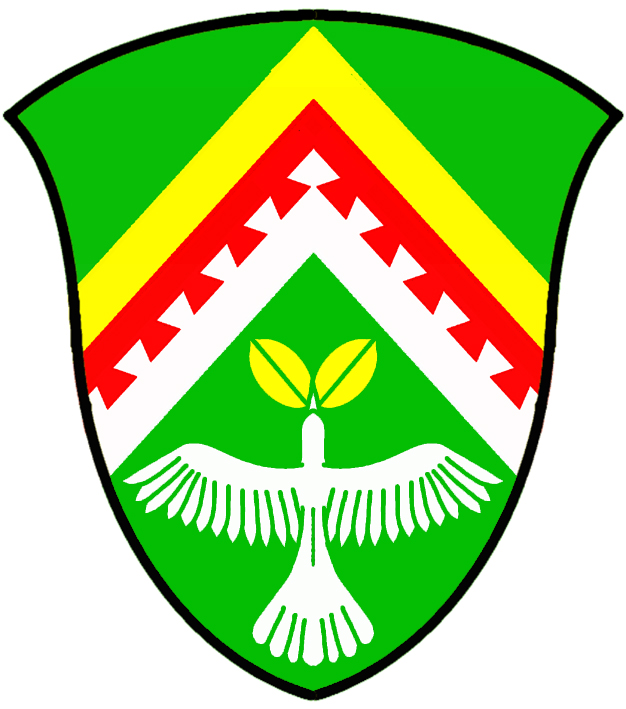
a chevron enhanced - Vert; a chevron enhanced, per chevron or and argent, over the partition line another, the lower edge dovetailed, gules, in base a dove ascending argent, holding in its beak two leaves or - Kwnanonzame Town Committee, RSA

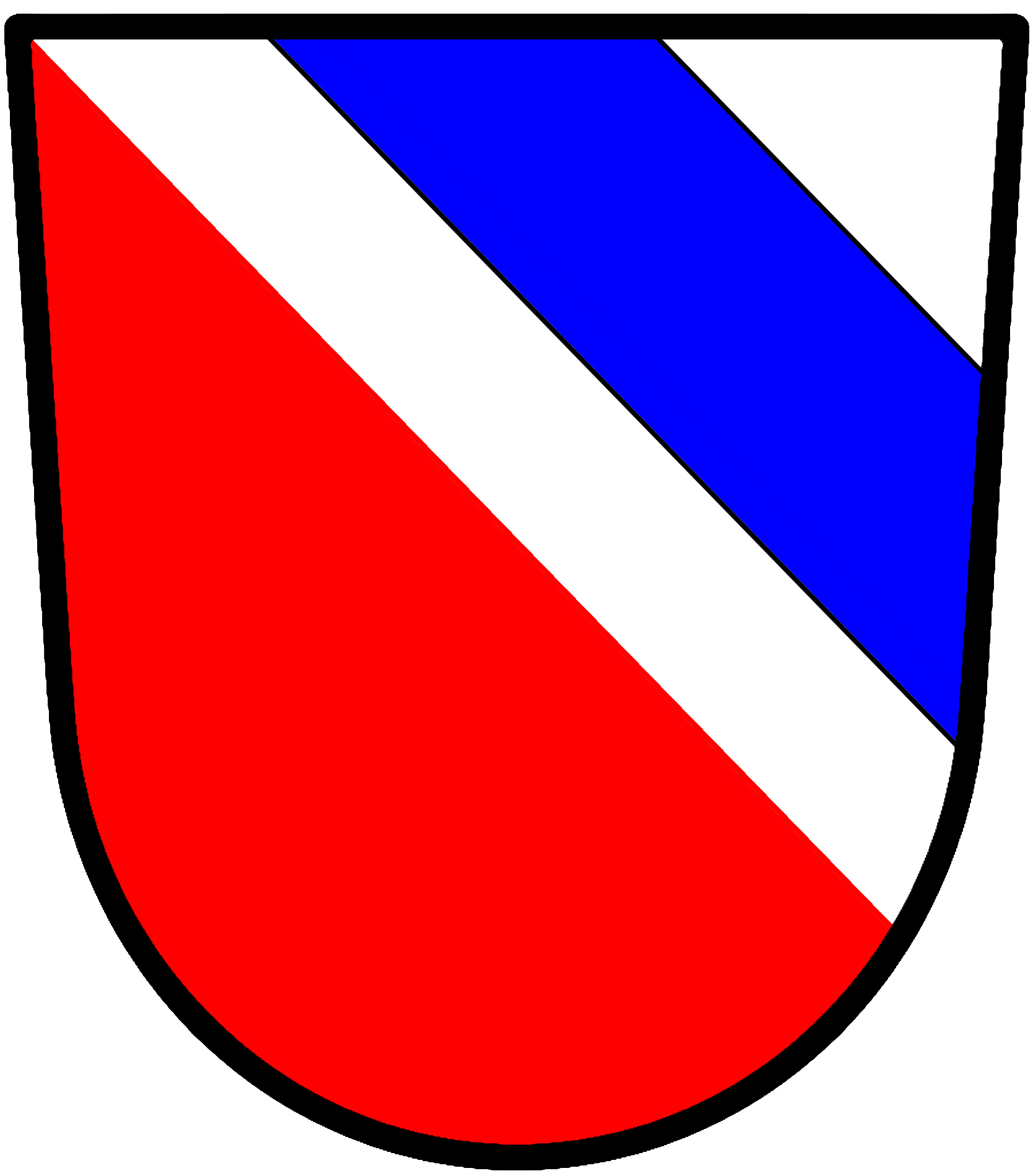
a bend enhanced - Per bend argent and gules; a bend enhanced azure - Moritz, USA

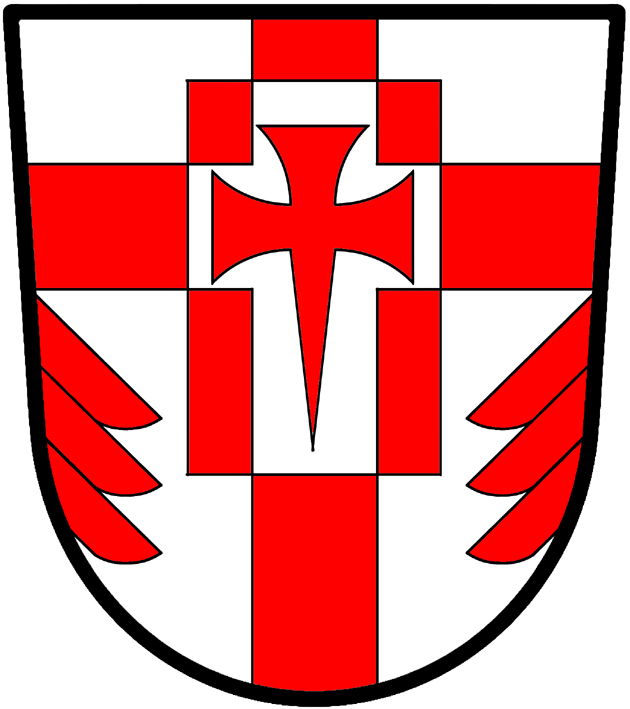
a cross enhanced - Argent; a cross enhanced gules, over all a billet charged with a cross pattée fitchée, all counterchanged and in base issuant from each flank a demi fir tree in pale gules - St. George's Church Pickering Village, Canada

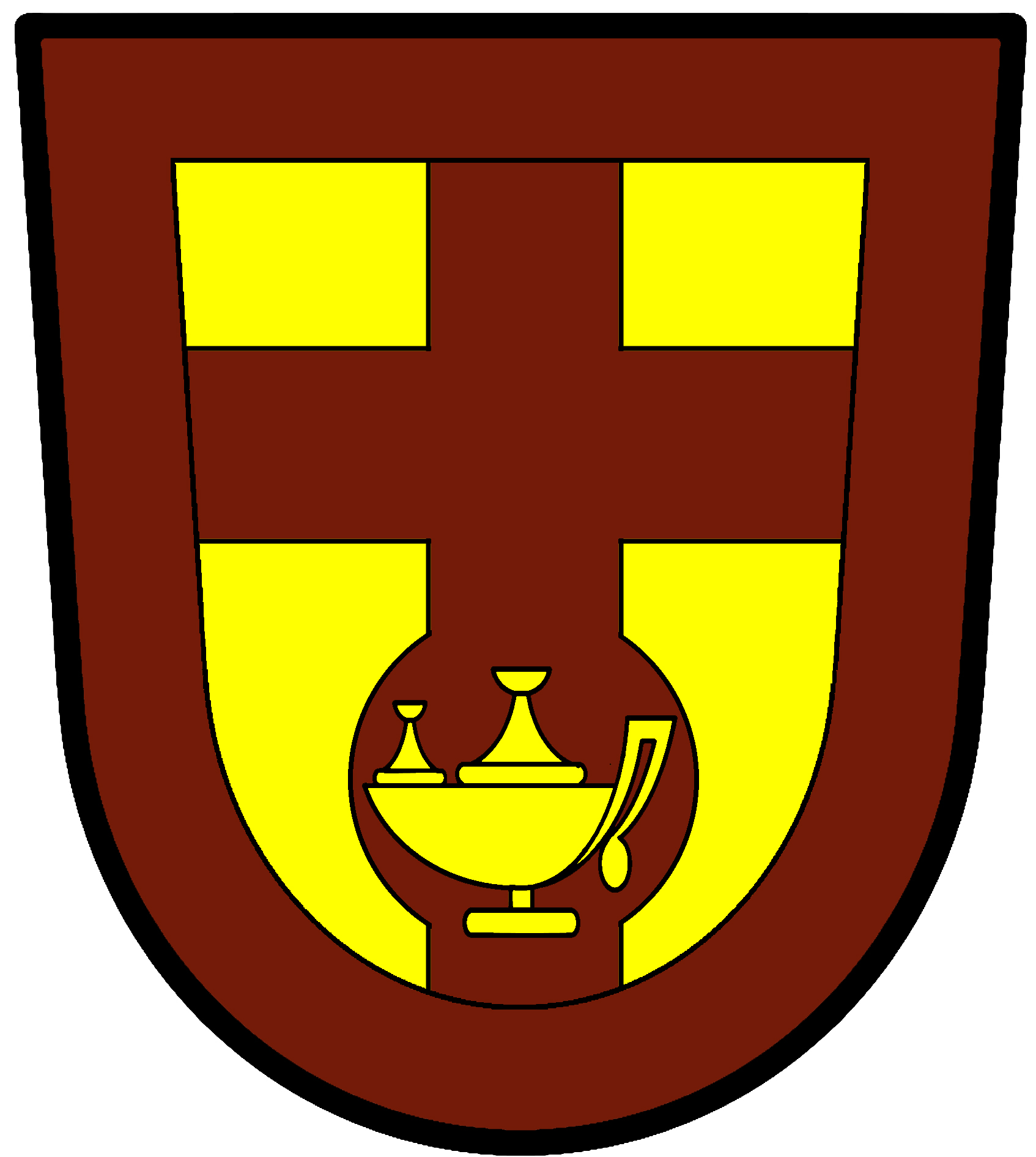
a Latin cross throughout (aka a cross enhanced) - Or; a Latin cross throughout, the lower limb nowy, murrey, charged on the node with a lamp inflamed, or; within a bordure murrey - Mmabatho College of Nursing, RSA

When an ordinary is shown lower down the shield than its usual position, it is described as debased or abased or abaisse or dehanced.

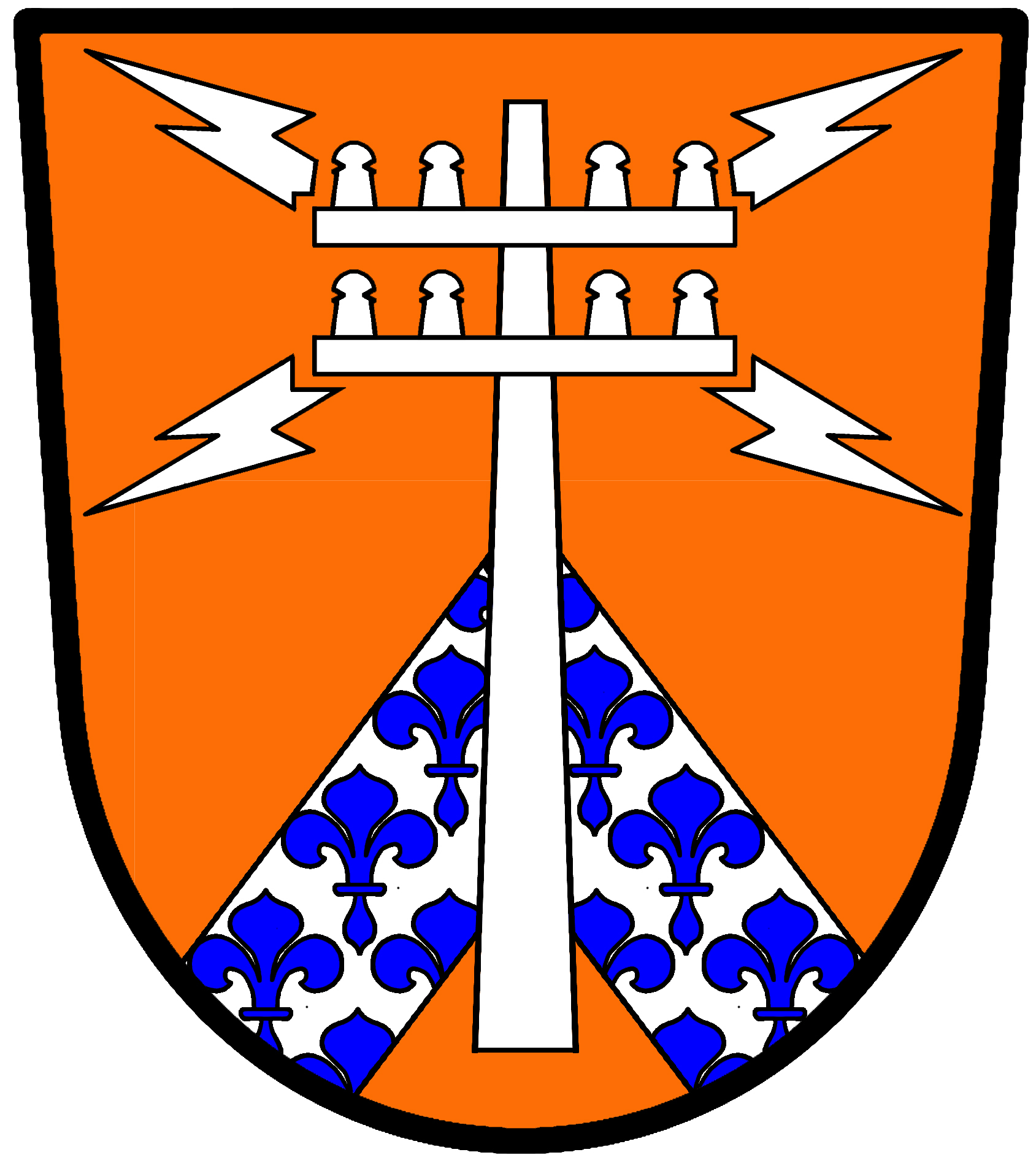
a chevron abased - Tenny, a chevron abased, argent semy de lis azure, overall a telephone pole radiant with four lightning flashes of the second - 302 Signal Battalion, USA

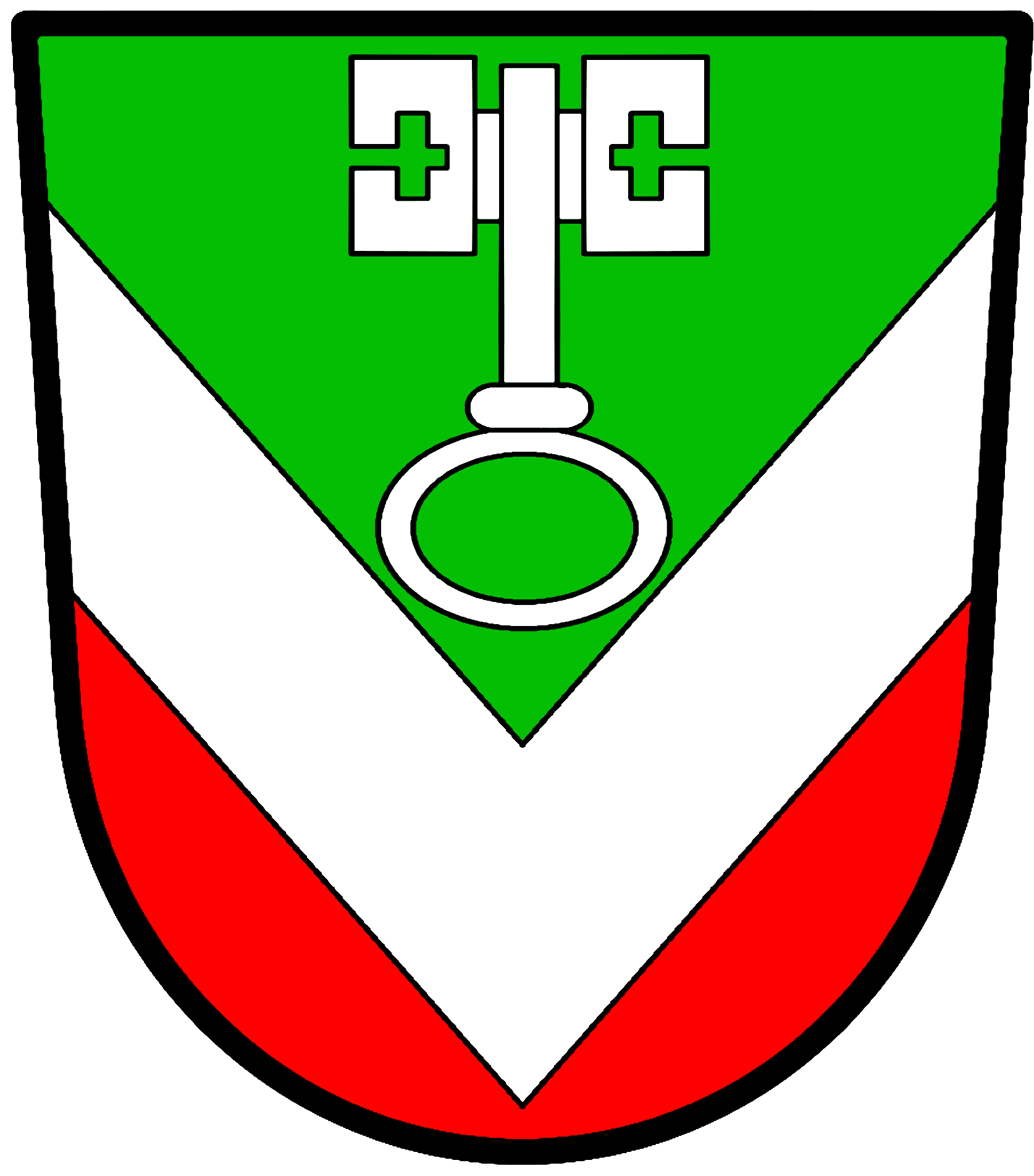
a chevron reversed abased - Per chevron inverted abaisse [abased], vert and gules, a chevron inverted abaisse [abased], in chief a double warded key erect, argent - Boikutlo Public School, RSA

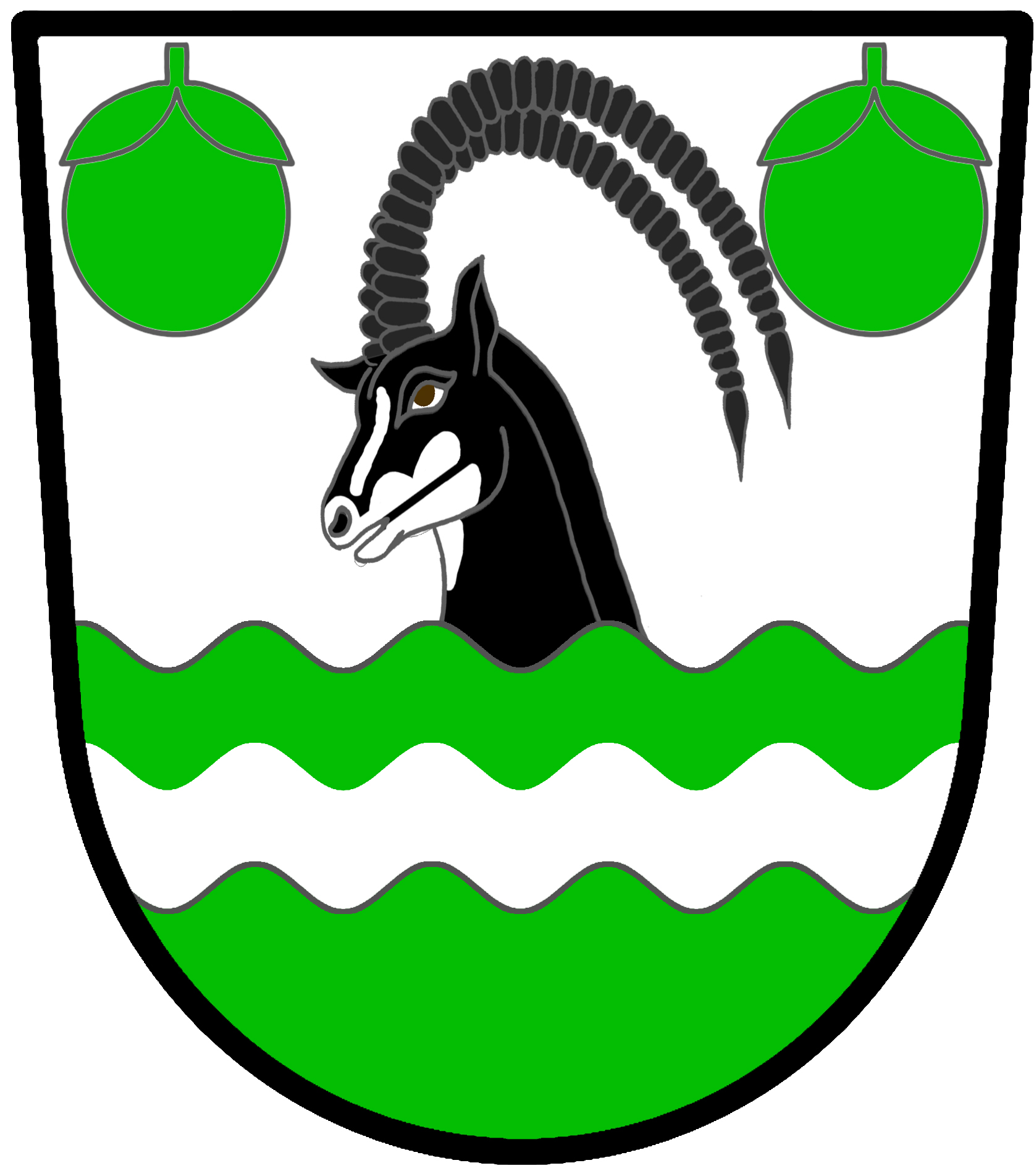
a fess abased - Per fess wavy abaisse [abased] argent and vert, a fess wavy abaisse per fess wavy counterchanged, issuant therefrom a sable antelope's head proper, between in chief two oranges slipped and leaved, vert - White River Town Council, RSA

== Rompu ==
An ordinary rompu is "broken" in some way, though the form of the breaking may vary considerably and may perhaps need further description to avoid confusion.

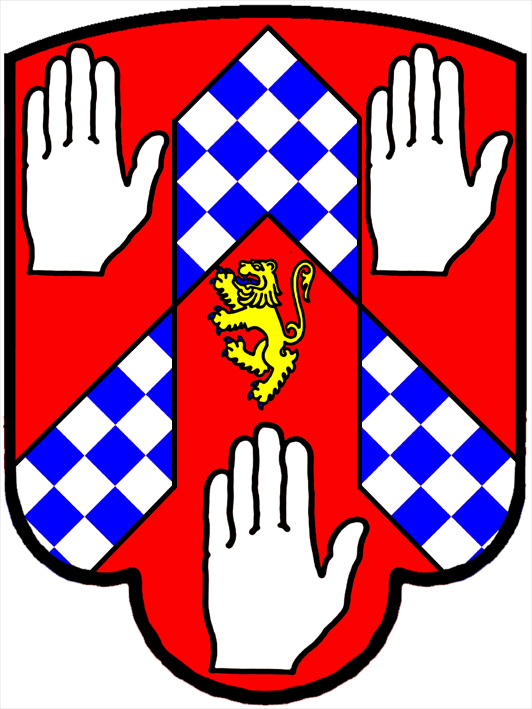
a chevron rompu - Gules; a chevron rompu chequy azure and argent ...

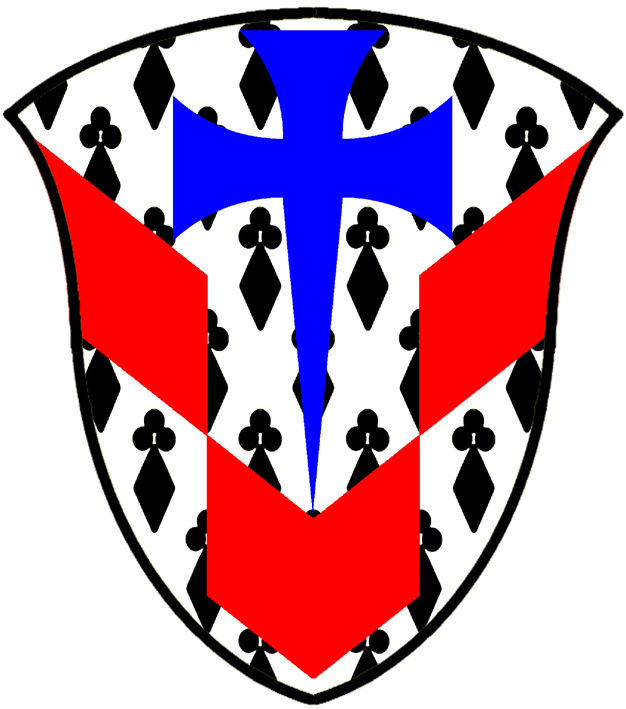
a chevron rompu reversed - Ermine; a chevron rompu reversed gules ...

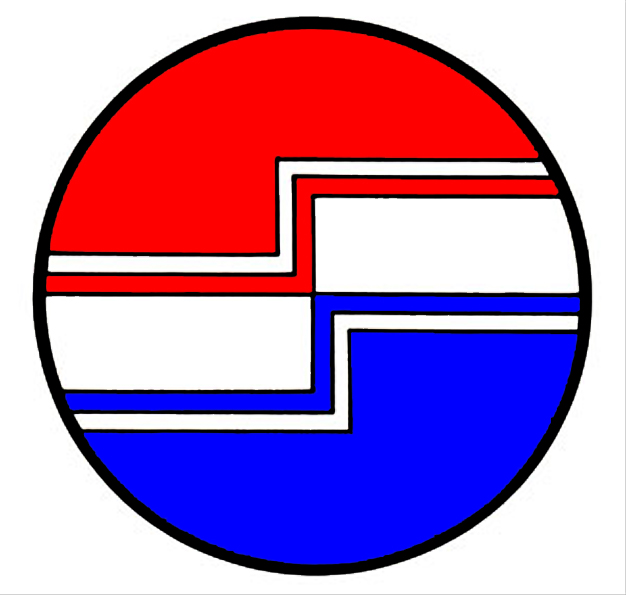
a fess rompu - On a roundel per fess gules and azure a fess rompu, cottised, argent - Albion Herald, Canada

An example is the chevronels rompu in the arms of Danzé, Loir et Cher, France. A chevron 'rompu' has the central section shifted vertically upward, as in the coat of the US 278th Armored Infantry Battalion. (There is an example of a chevron double rompu reversed in the arms of USCGC Biscayne Bay.) A bend rompu arraswise of an unusual form can be found in the arms of the 99th Air Base Wing of the United States Air Force. "Rompu" should be distinguished from "fracted". The arms of the Roossenekal Local Area Committee are Per chevron Gules and Azure, a chevron fracted and embattled to chief Or, between in chief a rose Argent, barbed and seeded, and in base a cross fleuretty, Or. The form of the "fracting" can be specified.

An ordinary affaissée, in French heraldry, is wavy in the form of a depression in its middle.

The word rompu is also applied to a common charge which is broken, e.g. "a circular chain with link rompu at the top", although this is more usually blazoned as fracted.

== See also ==
- Line (heraldry)

== Bibliography ==
- Boutell's Heraldry (revised by J.P. Brooke-Little, Norroy and Ulster King of Arms). Frederick Warne, London and New York, 1983.
- A.C. Fox-Davies. A Complete Guide to Heraldry (revised by J P Brooke-Little, Richmond Herald). Thomas Nelson and Sons, London, 1969.
- A.C. Fox-Davies. The Art of Heraldry: An Encyclopædia of Armory. Bloomsbury Books. London. 1986 (first published 1904).
- Kevin Greaves. A Canadian Heraldic Primer. The Heraldry Society of Canada, Ottawa, 2000.
- Sir Thomas Innes of Learney, Lord Lyon King of Arms. Scots Heraldry (revised Malcolm R Innes of Edingight, Marchmont Herald). Johnston and Bacon, London and Edinburgh, 1978.
- Alexander Nisbet. A system of heraldry. T&A Constable. Edinburgh.1984(first published 1722)
- Sir James Balfour Paul, Lord Lyon King of Arms. An Ordinary of Arms Contained in the Public Register of All Arms and Bearings in Scotland. W. Green & Sons. Edinburgh. 1903.
- David Reid of Robertland and Vivien Wilson. An Ordinary of Arms, volume 2 [1902-1973]. Lyon Office. Edinburgh. 1977.
- Urquhart, R M . Scottish Civic Heraldry: Regional - Islands - District. Heraldry Today. London. 1979.
