= Dukes in the United Kingdom =

Highest-ranking hereditary title in the peerages of the United Kingdom

Duke, in the United Kingdom, is the highest-ranking hereditary title in all five peerages of the British Isles. A duke thus outranks all other holders of titles of nobility (marquess, earl, viscount and baron or lord of parliament).

The wife of a duke is known as a duchess, which is also the title of a woman who holds a dukedom in her own right, referred to as a duchess suo jure; her spouse, however, does not receive any title. In the order of precedence in the United Kingdom, non-royal dukes without state offices or positions generally take precedence before all other nobility, in order of date of creation, but after royalty and certain officers of state.

== Royal dukedoms ==
A royal duke is a duke who is a member of the British royal family, entitled to the style of "His Royal Highness".

The current royal dukedoms are, in order of precedence of their holders (that is, not in order of precedence of the dukedoms themselves):

1. Duke of Cornwall (England), Duke of Rothesay (Scotland), Duke of Cambridge (United Kingdom) (currently all one person) held by William, Prince of Wales (elder son of King Charles III)
2. Duke of Sussex, held by Prince Harry (younger son of King Charles III)
3. Duke of York, formerly held by Andrew Mountbatten-Windsor (brother of King Charles III), but not currently used
4. Duke of Edinburgh, held by Prince Edward (brother of King Charles III)
5. Duke of Gloucester, held by Prince Richard (first cousin once removed of King Charles III)
6. Duke of Kent, held by Prince Edward (first cousin once removed of King Charles III)

With the exceptions of the dukedoms of Cornwall and Rothesay (which can only be held by the eldest son of the Sovereign who is also heir apparent) as well as the last creation of the dukedom of Edinburgh (which is a life peerage that will become extinct on the death of the current Duke), royal dukedoms are hereditary, according to the terms of the letters patent that created them, which usually contain the standard remainder to the "heirs male of his body lawfully begotten." The British monarch also holds and is entitled to the revenues of the Duchy of Lancaster, and within the borders of the County Palatine of Lancashire is by tradition saluted as "the Duke of Lancaster" even though the title is technically extinct, while, in the Channel Islands, the monarch is informally known as the Duke of Normandy. Even when the monarch is a Queen regnant, she does not use the title of Duchess.

== Non-royal dukedoms ==
There are the following extant non-royal dukes in the United Kingdom (in alphabetical order):

1. Duke of Abercorn (Ireland), Duke of Châtellerault (France) (currently all one person)
2. Duke of Argyll (Scotland), (United Kingdom)
3. Duke of Atholl (Scotland)
4. Duke of Beaufort (England)
5. Duke of Bedford (England)
6. Duke of Buccleuch (Scotland), Duke of Queensberry (Scotland) (currently all one person)
7. Duke of Devonshire (England)
8. Duke of Fife (United Kingdom)
9. Duke of Grafton (England)
10. Duke of Hamilton (Scotland) (senior non-royal duke in that peerage), Duke of Brandon (Great Britain) (currently all one person)
11. Duke of Leinster (Ireland) (senior non-royal duke in that peerage)
12. Duke of Manchester (Great Britain)
13. Duke of Marlborough (England)
14. Duke of Montrose (Scotland)
15. Duke of Norfolk (England) (premier non-royal duke in that peerage) (also serve as Earl Marshal)
16. Duke of Northumberland (Great Britain)
17. Duke of Richmond (England), Duke of Gordon (Scotland), (United Kingdom), Duke of Lennox (Scotland), Duke of Aubigny (France) (currently all one person)
18. Duke of Roxburghe (Scotland)
19. Duke of Rutland (England)
20. Duke of Somerset (England)
21. Duke of St Albans (England)
22. Duke of Sutherland (United Kingdom)
23. Duke of Wellington (United Kingdom)
24. Duke of Westminster (United Kingdom)

== Forms of address ==
A Duke's coronet (heraldic design)

- Begin: My Lord Duke
- Address: His Grace the Duke of _____
- Speak to as: Your Grace (formal and employees), Duke (social)
- Ceremonial, formal, or legal title: The Most High, Noble and Potent Prince His Grace [forename], Duke of _____.

== Coronet ==
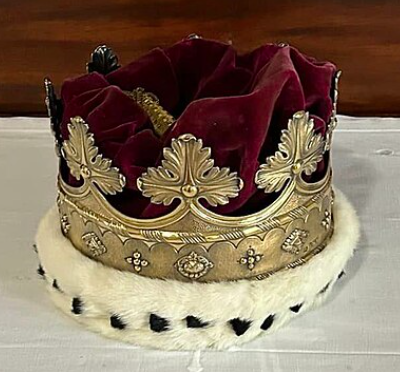
Coronet of the Dukes of Manchester, chased as jewelled but not actually gemmed, with eight strawberry leaves and an ermine lining.

A British or Irish duke is entitled to a coronet (a silver-gilt circlet, chased as jewelled but not actually gemmed) bearing eight conventional strawberry leaves on the rim of the circlet. The physical coronet is only actually worn at coronations, and was not used at the coronation of Charles III and Camilla. Any peer can bear his coronet of rank on his coat of arms above the shield.

== See also ==
- British nobility
- List of dukes in the peerages of Britain and Ireland
- List of dukedoms in the peerages of Britain and Ireland
