= Embowed =

Heraldic attitude indicating curved or arched

The Triskelion on the Flag of the Isle of Man

Embowed (/ɛmˈboʊd/) is a term in heraldry and architecture which means:

- curved like a bow (when applied to fish, animals or heraldic charges)
- bent (when applied to the human arm or leg), or
- having an arch or arches but, in the Anglophone heraldries, concave ones, not bulging out convex ones.

== Examples ==
The heraldic examples illustrated show the pile embowed inverted throughout azure of the Coat of arms of the Western Cape, and the three legs embowed conjoined in the fesse points in armour proper spurred and garnished or of the Triskelion on the Flag of the Isle of Man and its coat of arms. Fish embowed can be seen in the crest of Thompson Rivers University.
