= Thyrsus =

Wand or staff carried during Hellenic festivals and ceremonies

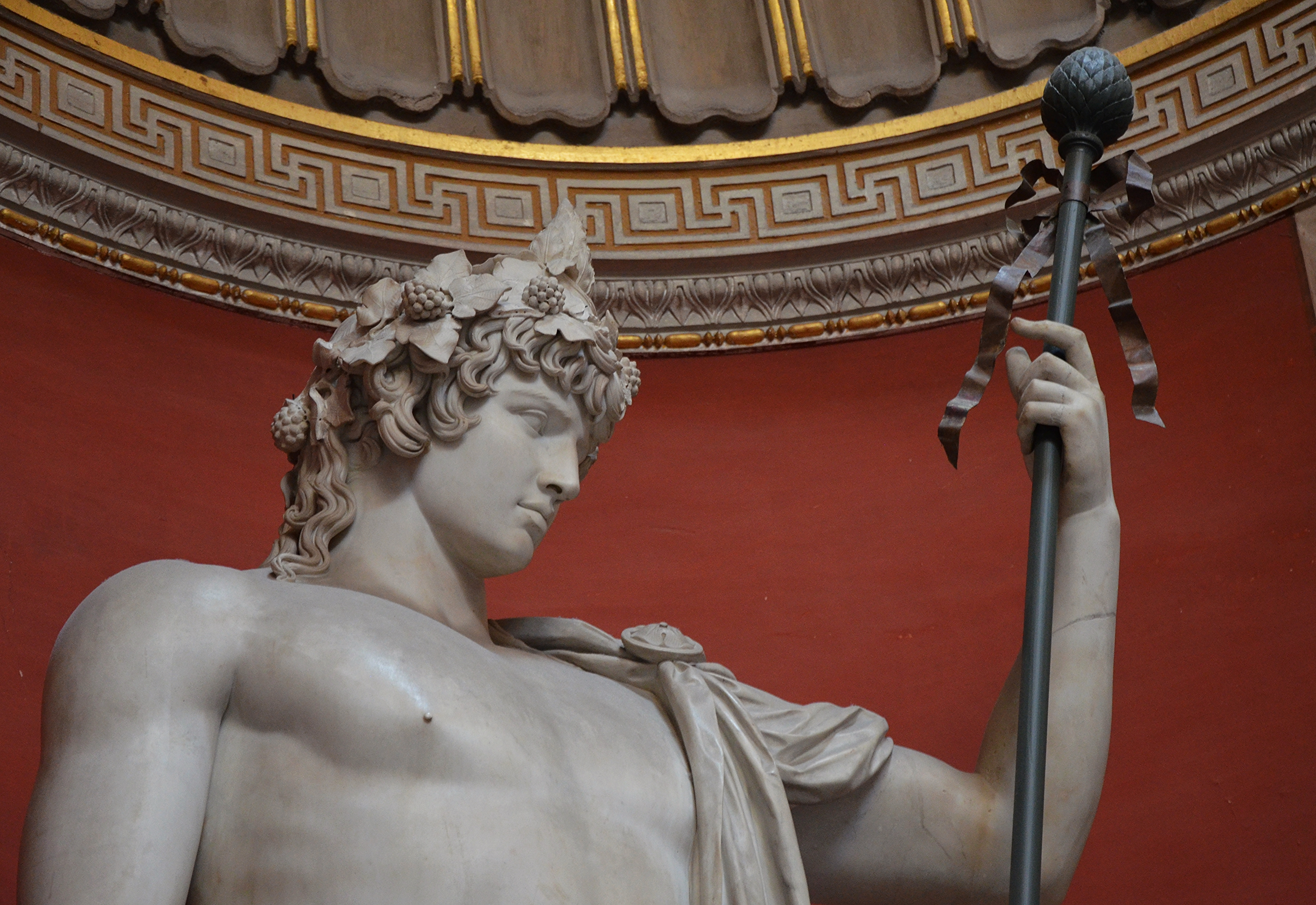
Antinous holding the thyrsus while posed as Dionysus (Museo Pio-Clementino)

In Ancient Greece a thyrsus (/ˈθɜːrsəs/) or thyrsos (/ˈθɜːrsɒs/; Ancient Greek: θύρσος) was a wand or staff of giant fennel (Ferula communis) covered with ivy vines and leaves, sometimes wound with taeniae and topped with a pine cone, artichoke, fennel, or by a bunch of vine-leaves and grapes or ivy-leaves and berries, carried during Hellenic festivals and religious ceremonies. The thyrsus is typically associated with the Greek god Dionysus (and his subsequent Roman equivalent Bacchus) as a symbol of prosperity, fertility, and hedonism.

== Religious and ceremonial use ==
In Greek religion, the staff was carried by the devotees of Dionysus. Euripides wrote that honey dripped from the thyrsos staves that the Bacchic maenads carried. The thyrsus was a sacred instrument at religious rituals and fêtes.

The fabulous history of Bacchus relates that he converted the thyrsi carried by himself and his followers into dangerous weapons, by concealing an iron point in the head of leaves. Hence his thyrsus is called "a spear enveloped in vine-leaves", and its point was thought to incite to madness.

== Symbolism ==
The thyrsus, associated with the followers of Dionysus (the satyrs, thiasus, and maenads or Bacchantes), is a symbol of prosperity, fertility, hedonism, and pleasure/enjoyment in general. The thyrsus was tossed in the Bacchic dance:

Pentheus: The thyrsus—in my right hand shall I hold it?

Or thus am I more like a Bacchanal?

Dionysus: In thy right hand, and with thy right foot raise it.

== Literature ==
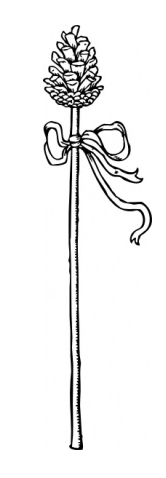
Thyrsus staff tied with taenia and topped with a pine cone

In the Iliad, Diomedes, one of the leading warriors of the Achaeans, mentions the thyrsus while speaking to Glaucus, one of the Lycian commanders in the Trojan army, about Lycurgus, the king of Scyros:

He it was that drove the nursing women who were in charge of frenzied Bacchus through the land of Nysa, and they flung their thyrsi on the ground as murderous Lycurgus beat them with his oxgoad.

The thyrsus is explicitly attributed to Dionysus and his followers in Euripides's tragedy The Bacchae, which describes the degradation of Thebes in vindication for the sullied name of Dionysus's mortal mother. The story concerns the murder of the young king and the indoctrination of all the Theban women into Dionysus's cult, with the thyrsus serving as a badge of sorts for members.

To raise my Bacchic shout, and clothe all who respond / In fawnskin habits, and put my thyrsus in their hands– / The weapon wreathed with ivy-shoots ... There's a brute wildness in the fennel-wands; reverence it well.

Plato, in his philosophical dialogue Phaedo, quotes an Orphic proverb that metonymically distinguishes the "thyrsus-bearers" of a religion — those who display its external trappings, but do not necessarily understand its mysteries — from the "mystae" (mystics, Bacchantes) who have been initiated into its secrets. This proverb has entered the lexicon, with a meaning similar to "Many are called, but few are chosen."

I conceive that the founders of the mysteries had a real meaning and were not mere triflers when they intimated in a figure long ago that he who passes unsanctified and uninitiated into the world below will live in a slough, but that he who arrives there after initiation and purification will dwell with the gods. For 'many', as they say in the mysteries, 'are the thyrsus bearers, but few are the mystics', – meaning, as I interpret the words, the true philosophers.

In Part II of Johann Wolfgang von Goethe's Faust, Mephistopheles tries to catch a lamia, only to find out that she is an illusion and that he instead holds a thyrsus. The play contains major themes of sin and hedonism, and makes connection to Dionysus through the thyrsus:

Well, then, a tall one I will catch... And now a thyrsus-pole I snatch! Only a pine-cone as its head.

Robert Browning mentions the thyrsus in passing in The Bishop Orders His Tomb at St Praxed's Church, as the dying bishop confuses Christian piety with classical extravagance. Ovid talks about Bacchus carrying a thyrsus and his followers doing the same in his Metamorphoses Book III, which is a retelling of The Bacchae.

The bas-relief in bronze ye promised me, / Those Pans and nymphs ye wot of, and perchance / Some tripod, thyrsus, with a vase or so.

== Gallery ==
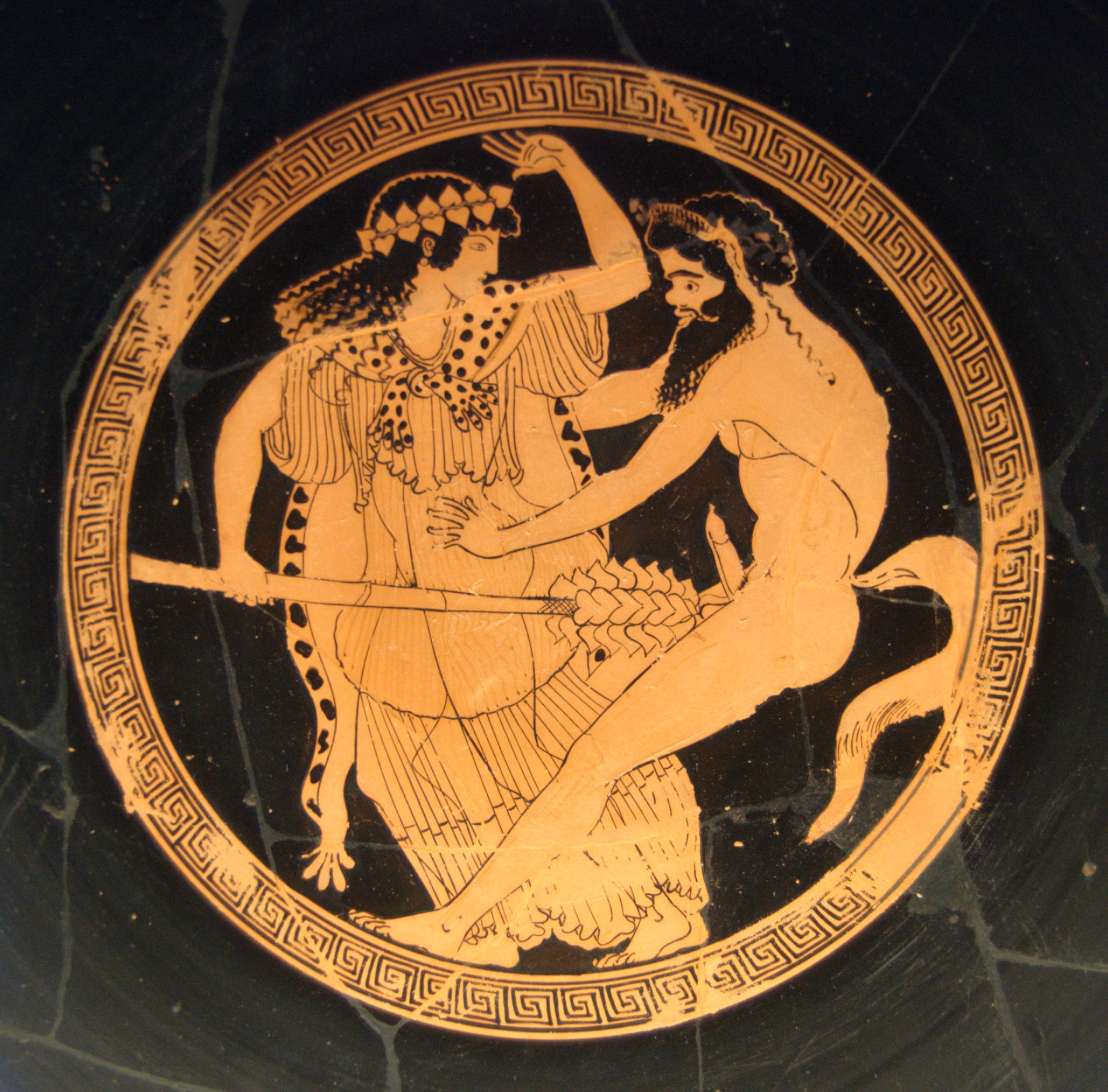
A Maenad using her thyrsos to ward off a Satyr, Attic red-figure kylix, c. 480 BC

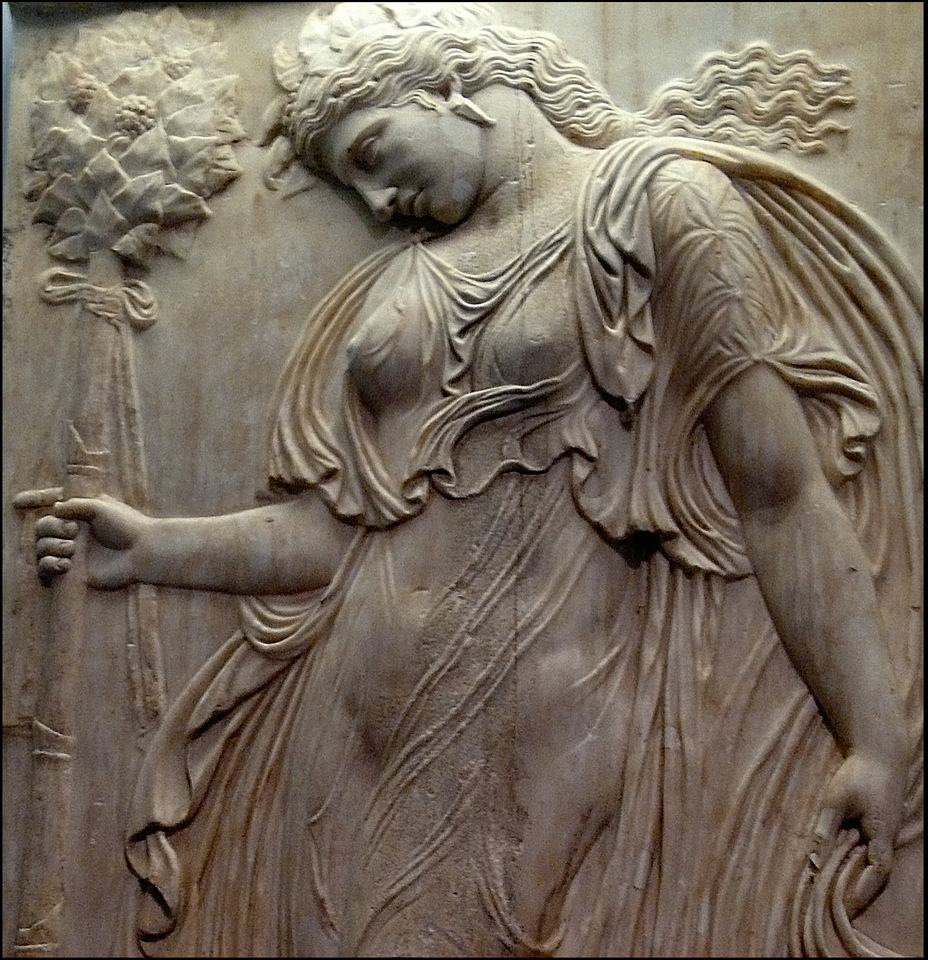
Roman relief showing a Maenad holding a thyrsus, 120–140 AD. Prado Museum, Madrid.

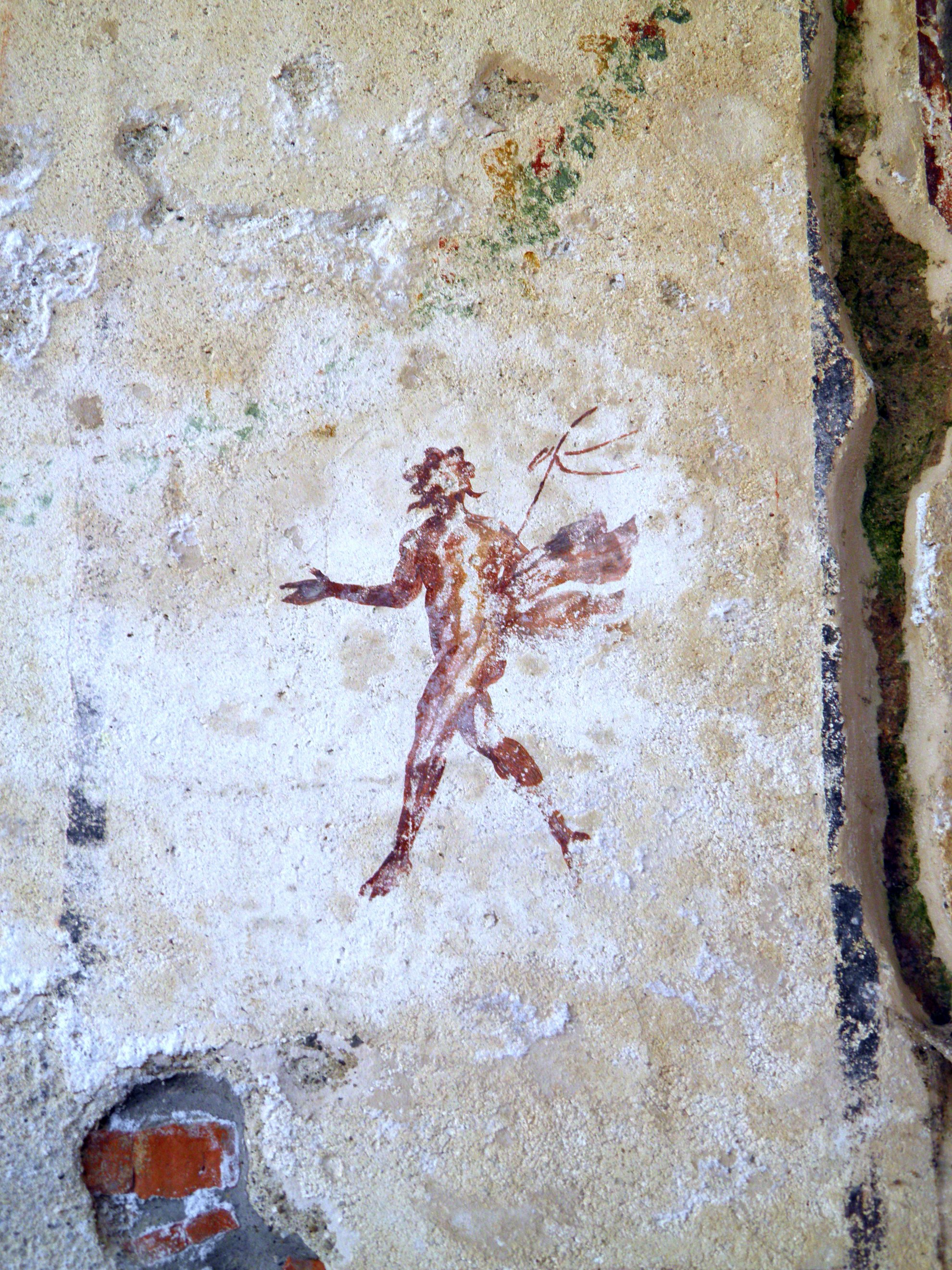
A mural of a striding Satyr carrying the thyrsus painted in the 1st century AD. Archaeological park of Baiae.

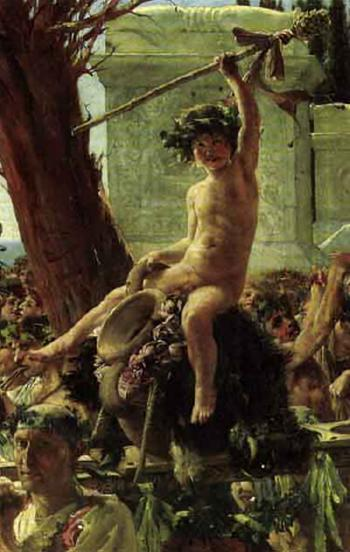
Bacchus Triumphant by John Reinhard Weguelin (1882)

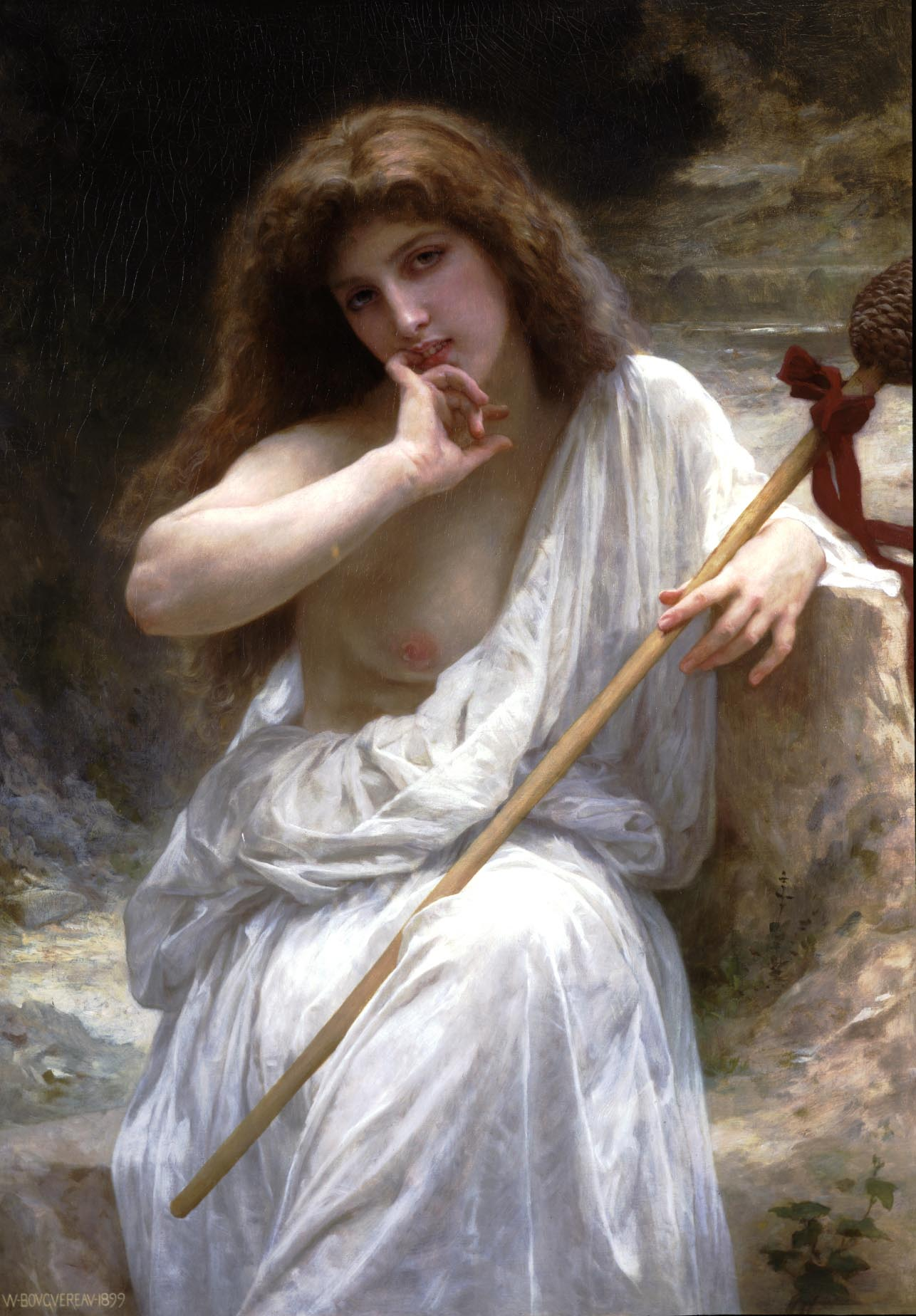
A Bacchant holding a thyrsus: Malice by William-Adolphe Bouguereau (1899)

== See also ==
- Cult of Dionysus
