= Headband =

Hair accessory

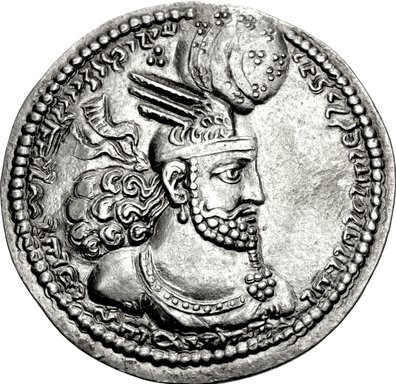
Iranian king wearing headband

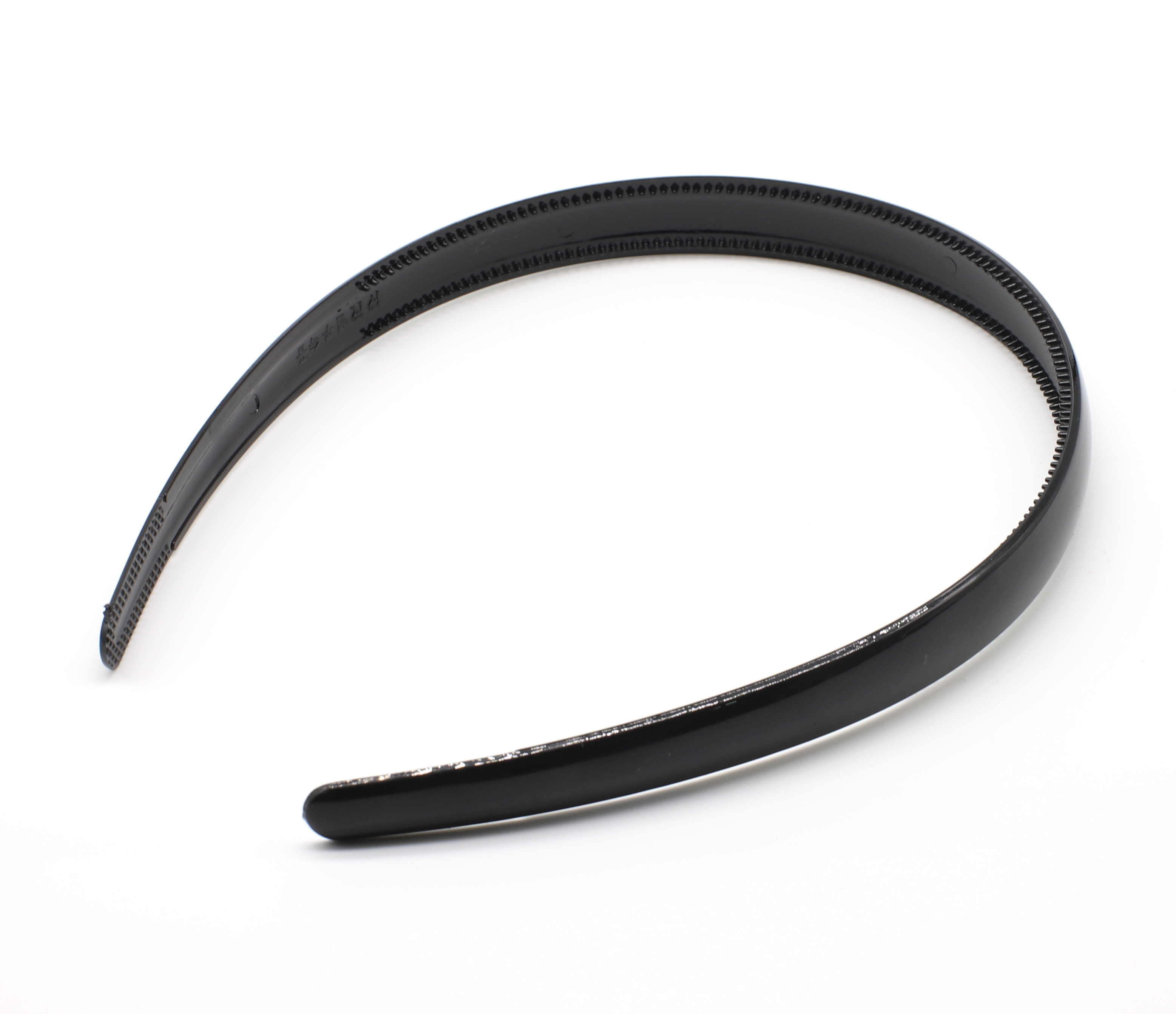
A hard plastic headband, or Alice band

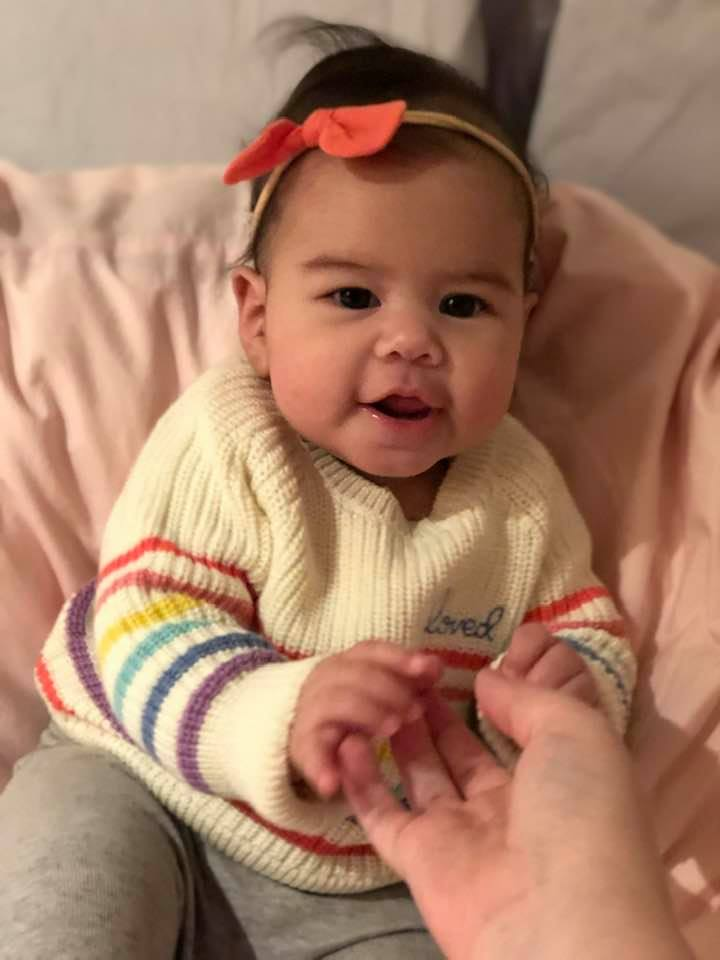
Baby wearing a headband

A headband (also called a hairband or sweatband) is a clothing accessory worn in the hair or around the forehead, usually to hold hair away from the face or eyes, or to help control forehead sweat or (rarely) to provide some protection to the head during physical activity. Headbands generally consist of a textile loop of elasticised and sometimes absorptive or padded material, or a horseshoe-shaped piece of flexible plastic or metal. They come in assorted shapes and sizes and are used for a variety of purposes: aesthetic (fashion); practical (holding back hair); protective; utilitarian (absorbing sweat); or for combinations of these reasons.

In the UK, horseshoe-shaped headbands are sometimes called "Alice bands" after the headbands that Alice is often depicted wearing in Lewis Carroll's Through the Looking-Glass.

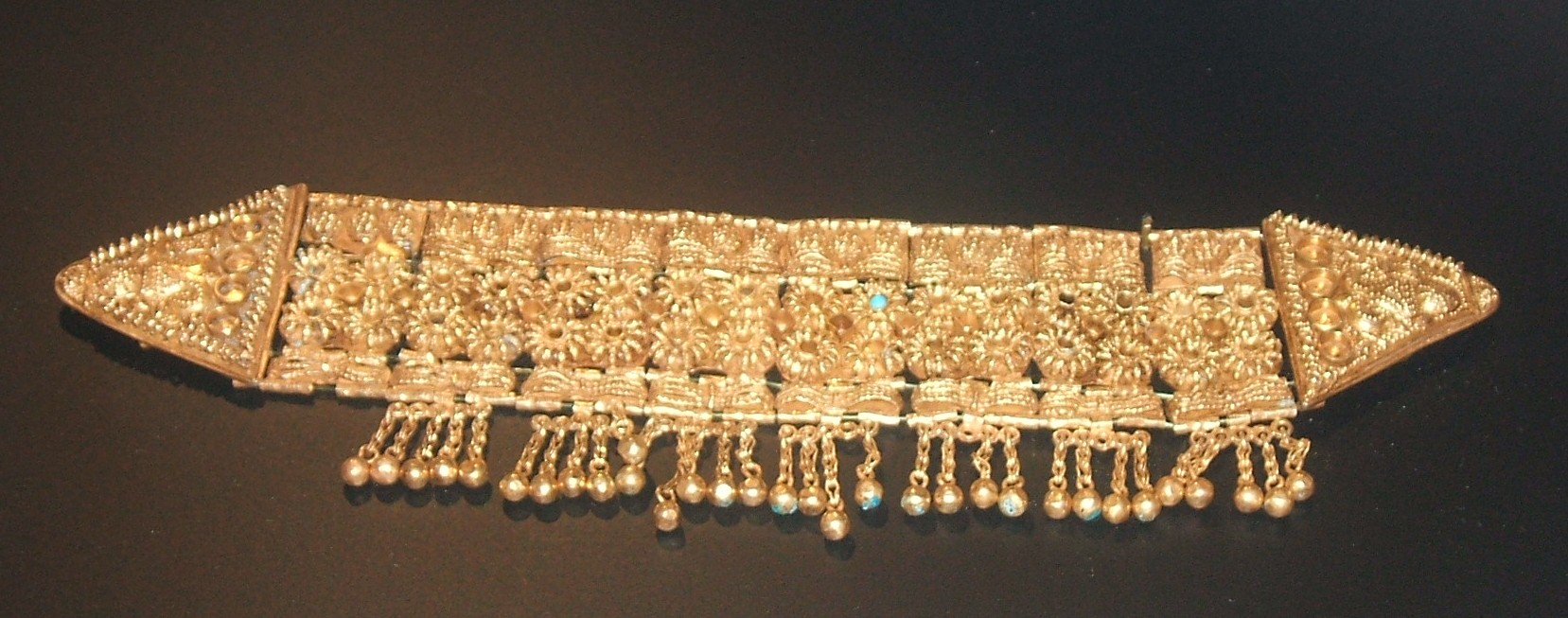
Tartessian gold headband from the Iron Age

== History ==
=== Greeks and Romans ===
The beginning of headbands was no later than around 475 BC to 330 BC, with the ancient Greeks, who wore hair wreaths. The Greeks and Romans wore these pieces for very special occasions or an important event. Cultures such as the Etruscans and Romans started to decorate their wreaths with jewels made up of gold and silver. While wreaths are certainly a likely beginning of today's headbands, some believe that current day hair bands have slowly taken shape from scarves that were worn around the head or were modified from the band of hats that tied under the chin.

=== Early 20th century ===
In the early 20th century, wide headbands known as headache bands were very popular accessories in women's fashion. Their name came from the belief that the tight pressure they provided around the forehead could relieve or prevent headaches. The French called such a garment a bandeau (bandeaux, plural). In the 1910s, headache bands would likely have been more lacy in design—a crochet central panel decorated with ribbons and rosettes and bordered with lace, for example. Examples from the 1920s and 1930s are more apt to be dramatic sheaths in exotic fabrics and decorated with feathers, and would have been worn with fashions by couturiers such as Paul Poiret. These sorts of headache bands probably achieved their peak of popularity in the 1920s. Today, items called headache bands are apt to be strictly utilitarian and medical in focus.

During the same period, jewelled headache bands or headbands, often in precious metals and precious gems, were popular.

==== 1920s ====
In the 1920s, the jewelry did not matter in the cost of materials nor value, rather the focus was on the design. Headbands were known as bandeaus. They were worn in the evenings with the most formal dresses, until 1925.

Styles of this kind of accessories include:

- Brain Binder
- Feather Headband
- Haircomb
- Headwrap
- Skullcap
- Tiara
- Wrap style

=== 1960s ===
During the 1950s and 1960s, many glamorous young women in Britain and the US wore plastic headbands with the beehive hairstyle, or silk veils when driving. At the same time, working-class women wrapped strips of cloth around their hair as protection from the industrial smog and dirty rain.

=== 1970s ===
After the Summer of Love of 1967, hippies wore tie dye and paisley bandanas as headbands in imitation of Leftist activists and guerrillas. These were also worn by many hard rock and heavy metal guitarists such as Jimi Hendrix, Keith Richards, Ted Nugent, Bruce Springsteen, or Link Wray during the early and mid 70s to keep cool on stage.

=== 1980s ===
Deely boppers were a fad in 1982.

Princess Diana famously wore an emerald and diamond choker as a headband in Melbourne on the occasion of a state tour of Australia in 1985.

== Fashion ==
=== Materials and uses ===
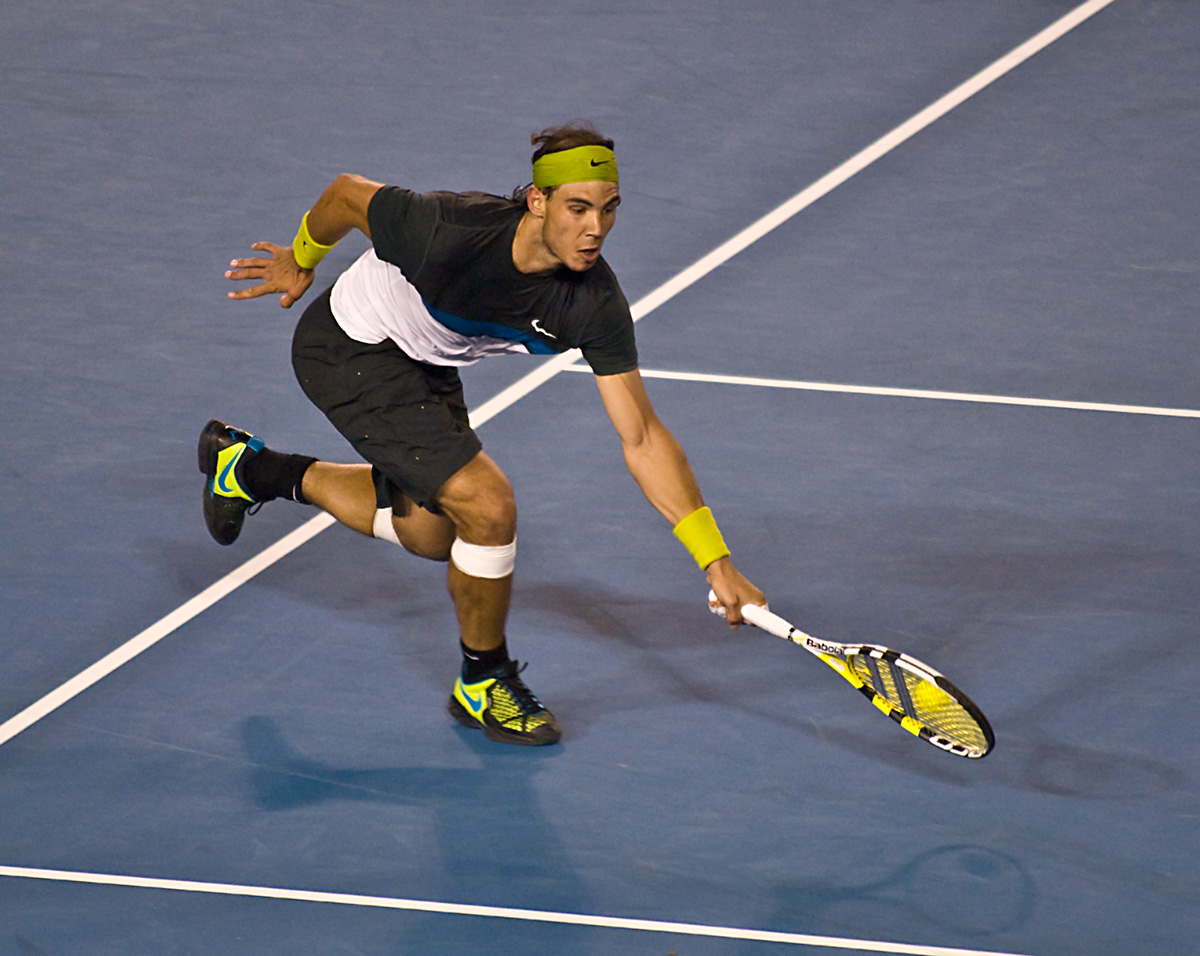
Rafael Nadal wearing green head band during a tennis match

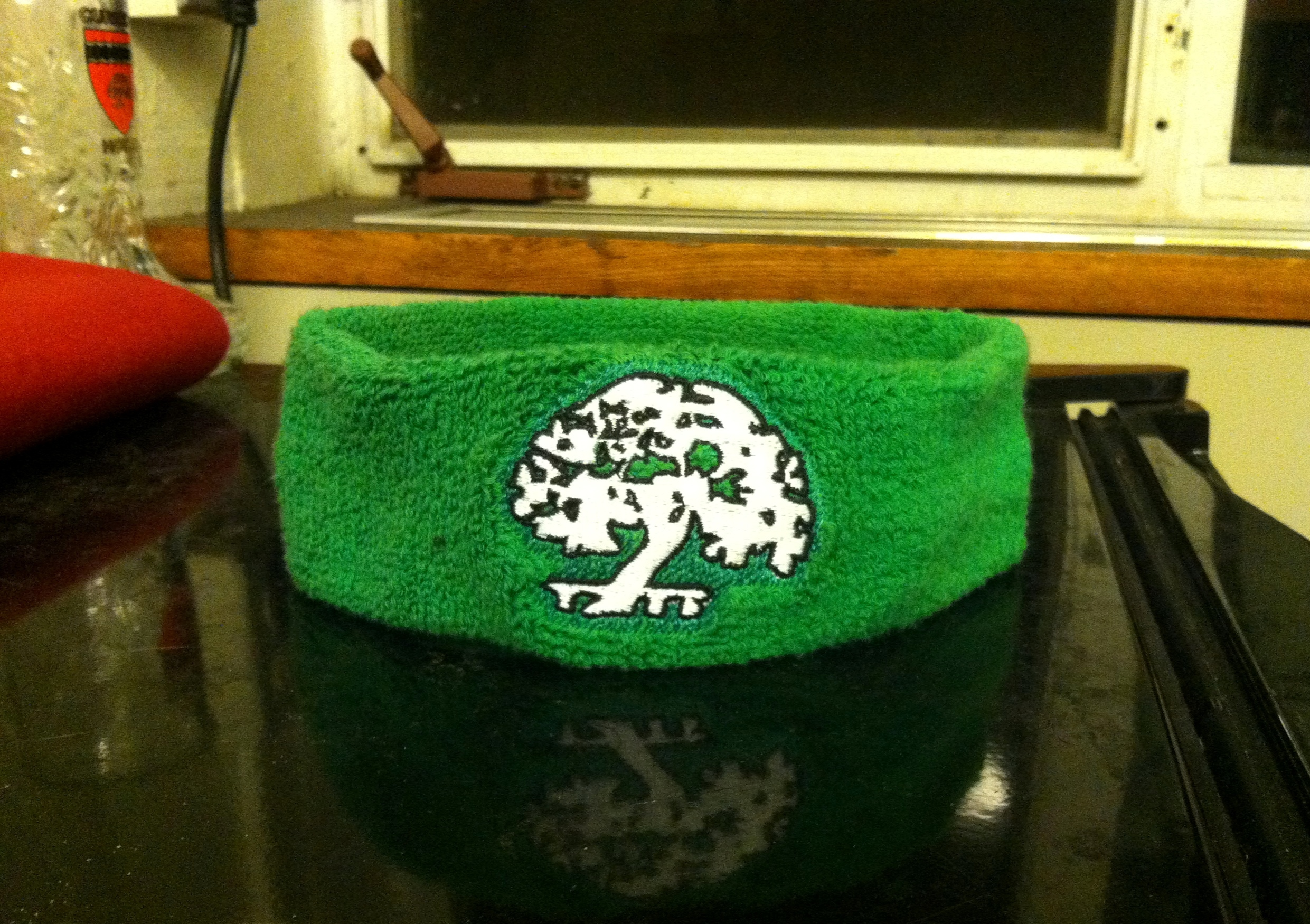
A headband depicting the Tree of Currier House (Harvard College)

There are many materials used for headbands such as wood, leather, plastic, metal, fabric, hemp, teeth, human and animal hair, bone, and novelty materials. The leather headbands are usually glued onto a harder plastic headband, or they are hand-stitched. Plastic headbands, which are most common, can be wavy, straight or angled and come in many colors. Metal can be used to form and support leather headbands. Metal-only headbands may be plain or decorated, sometimes with precious jewels. Fabric headbands are comfortable because they do not dig into the head. They usually have an elastic band, so that the headband forms to the head. Toothed headbands have comb-like teeth that are connected to the top part of the headband. Their teeth ensure that the hair stays in place.

Novelty headbands can be used for holidays and may have decorations attached such as bunny ears, reindeer ears, Santa Claus hats and others. Headbands are often part of a larger fashion statement—they can be color-coded and matched accordingly to one's outfit.

== Utilitarian uses ==
Headbands, or sweatbands, are worn around the forehead during physical activity to absorb sweat and keep it from reaching the eyes. Sweatbands are often made of a continuous loop of terrycloth, as it is a particularly absorbent fabric. Folded bandanas, usually knotted behind the head, also serve this purpose. Headbands are usually used for sports but have not been popular since the late 1970s or early 1980s. LeBron James is one of the most notable players who wears a headband during basketball games. They also come in the form of wristbands.

Headbands are also used for protection from cold and windy weather. These headbands are sometimes called earbands, which are made from a broad strip of heavy fabric, and have a contoured shape designed to fit over the ears, forehead, and neckline. Compared to winter hats, headbands have the advantages of providing warmth to exposed skin with minimal interference with the wearer's hairdo, allowing heat buildup formed by heavy exercise to vent through the top of the head, and requiring less storage space when not being worn. This type of headband is often used by skiers, snowboarders, runners, and workers who spend time in the cold weather.

Headbands are also available to prevent water from entering a person's ears while swimming. These headbands are thin, made of neoprene, and fit the head very tightly. These headbands are useful for swimmers who need to protect themselves from swimmer's ear but find traditional earplugs or ear putty uncomfortable.

Padded headbands are also available as protective equipment, though the actual level of 'protection' that a fabric and foam headband can provide against head injury is small to de minimis. They are used widely in association football. Foam 'halos' were mandatory for girls' lacrosse in Florida for a short time in 2015-17, before the mandate was updated to require a proper helmet in 2018.

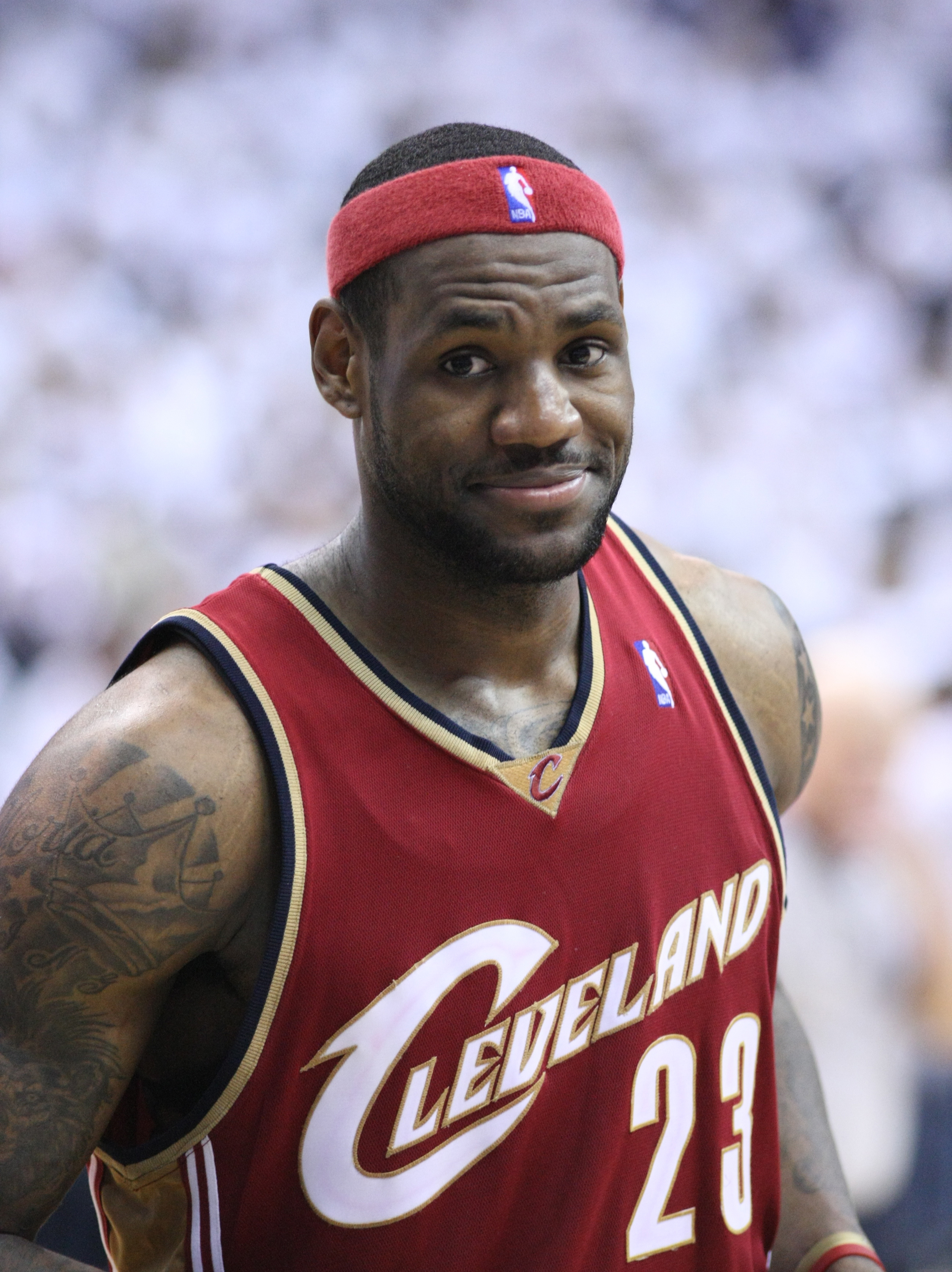
LeBron James seen wearing his signature headband

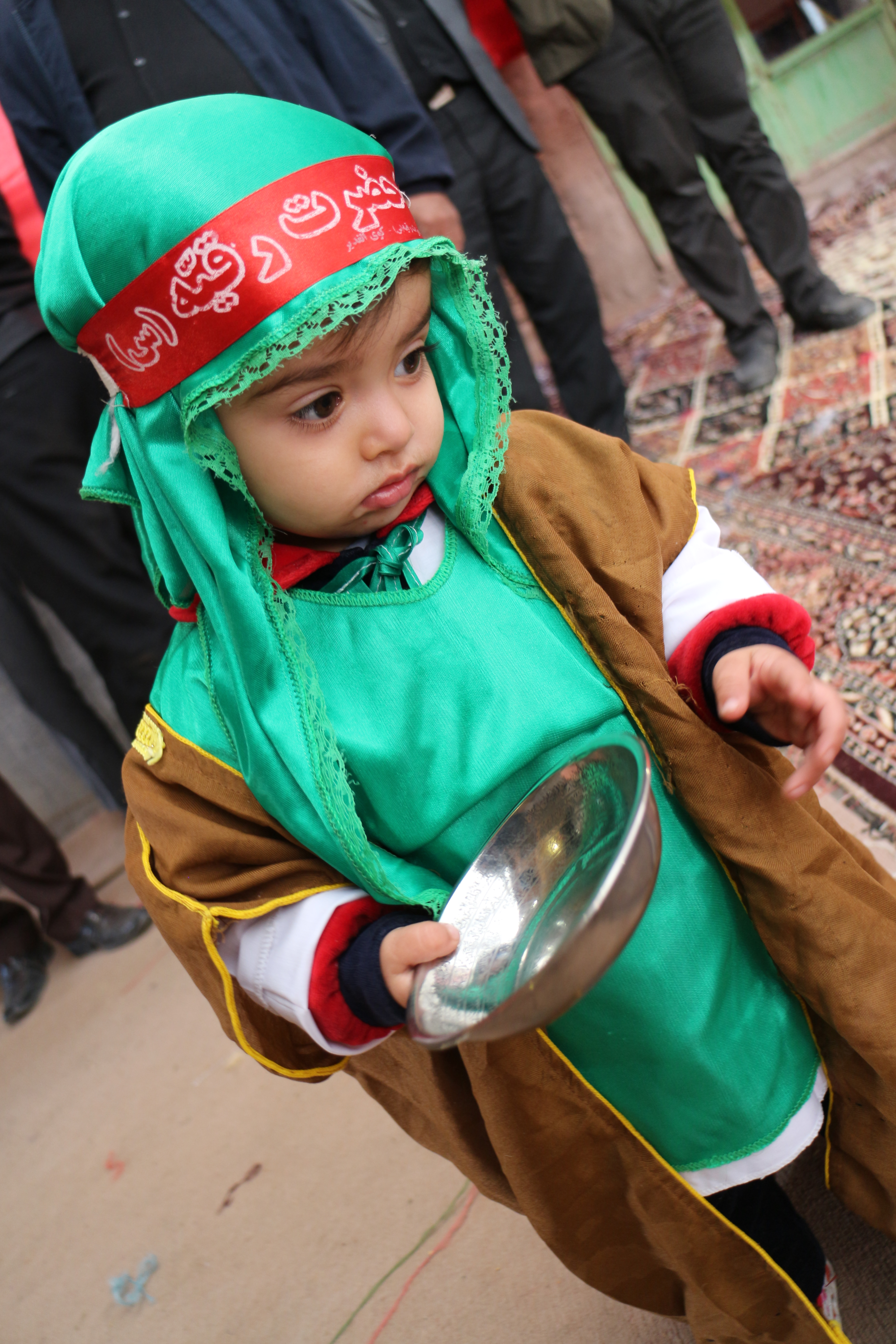
A child in a Shi'ite ritual wearing a red headband with the name "Ruqayyah" written on it

== Symbolism ==
The flag of Corsica shows a man wearing a headband.

In Japanese culture, hachimaki headbands may symbolise determination or devotion.

Traditionally in Korea, warriors and members of military organizations such as the hwarang wore specialized headbands that kept hair firmly in place. Practically, these headbands served to clear any obstruction to the eyes so as to not hinder the soldier in combat. Emblematically, the headbands served to symbolize strength of loyalty and submission to the state.

Contemporary Korean high school students, particularly male students, are often portrayed donning headbands in preparation for the rigorous college entrance examinations. Students commonly write encouraging or inspiring phrases on these headbands, such as "do or die!". This practice has been largely popularized by the media.

== See also ==
- Alice band
- Bandeau
- Circlet
- Deely bopper
- Diadem
- Ferronière
- Fillet
- Hachimaki
- Hair tie
- Headbands of Hope
- Laurel wreath
- Tainia
- Tiara
