= St. Baldrick's Foundation =

American nonprofit organization

- Founded: July 4, 1999
- Founders: John Bender; Tim Kenny; Enda McDonnel
- Location: Monrovia, California, U.S.
- Region served: International
- Key people: Kathleen Ruddy, executive director
- Website: www.stbaldricks.org

The St. Baldrick's Foundation is a not-for-profit organization, with the aim of raising funds to help find cures for children with cancer. The name of the foundation is not associated with a recognized Saint of the Catholic Church, but is an appropriation of the title of sainthood founded on word play ("bald" + patRick, since the first event they sponsored was held on St. Patrick's Day). Volunteers sponsored by family, friends, and employers shave their heads or "chop" their ponytails in solidarity with children who typically lose their hair during cancer treatment, in order to raise funds.

== History ==
Tim Kenny, John Bender, and Enda McDonnell founded the St. Baldrick's Foundation on July 4, 1999, as a challenge to see how they would give back for their "good fortune in business". The inaugural event was hosted on March 17, 2000, at Jim Prady's Pub in Manhattan, where $104,000 was raised by 19 shavees. The foundation officially registered as a 501(c)(3) charitable non-profit in 2004, and during their first year as an official foundation, they managed to raise over $5.3 million for the Children's Oncology Group. On January 9 and 10, St. Baldrick's hosted their inaugural Research Priorities Summit in New York City. Foundation board members and executives were in attendance, alongside 16 pediatric oncology researchers. According to their official website, 2012 marked $100 million given in childhood cancer research grants since their first year as an independent foundation in 2005.

== Events ==
All events are hosted by volunteers in the community, with the foundation providing planning tools and support. Volunteers can find events near them and help set up the event space, shave heads, have their heads shaved, or any combination of the three. Events have taken place in all 50 US states and 31 countries. Since 2000, St. Baldricks event organizers and volunteers have hosted nearly 4,200 head-shaving events and shaved over 190,500 heads, raising over $118 million for life-saving childhood cancer research. After a volunteer reaches a certain number of repeat years, the foundation awards them through "knighting ceremonies". According to Plenty Consulting, 2,600 volunteers had thus far earned the Knight of the Bald Table award in 2015, which is given for seven years of service to the organization. Charity Navigator gave the foundation a 94 out of a possible 100 score rating (2024) and 4 Stars in Financial Score out of a possible 4 Star rating. According to Better Business Bureau, the non-profit meets the 20 Standards for Charity Accountability.

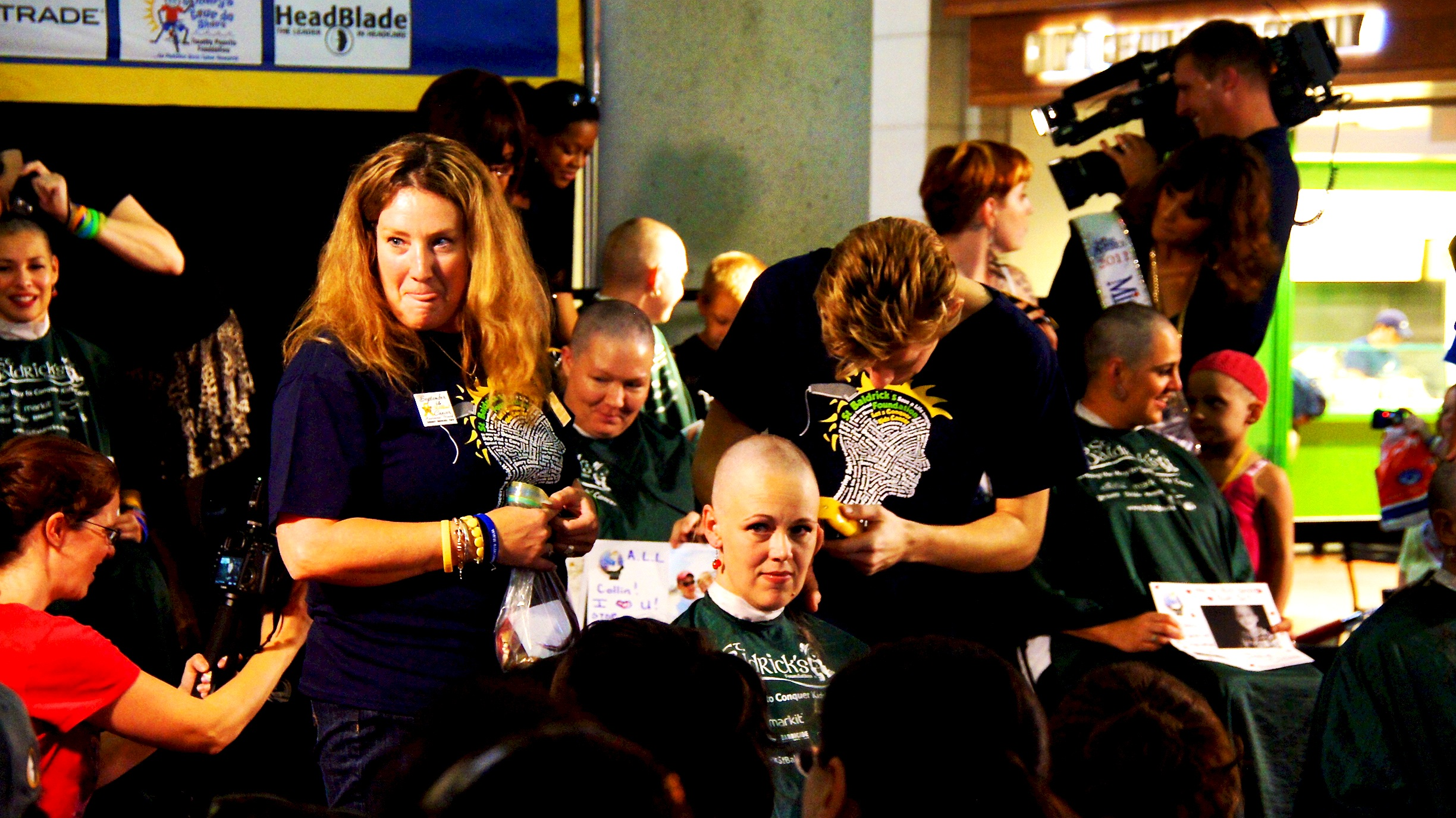
Women shaving their head at the 46 mommas program which is a fundraising initiative by St. Baldrick's

== See also ==
- Headbands of Hope
