= Fillet (clothing) =

Headband in Greco-Roman antiquity

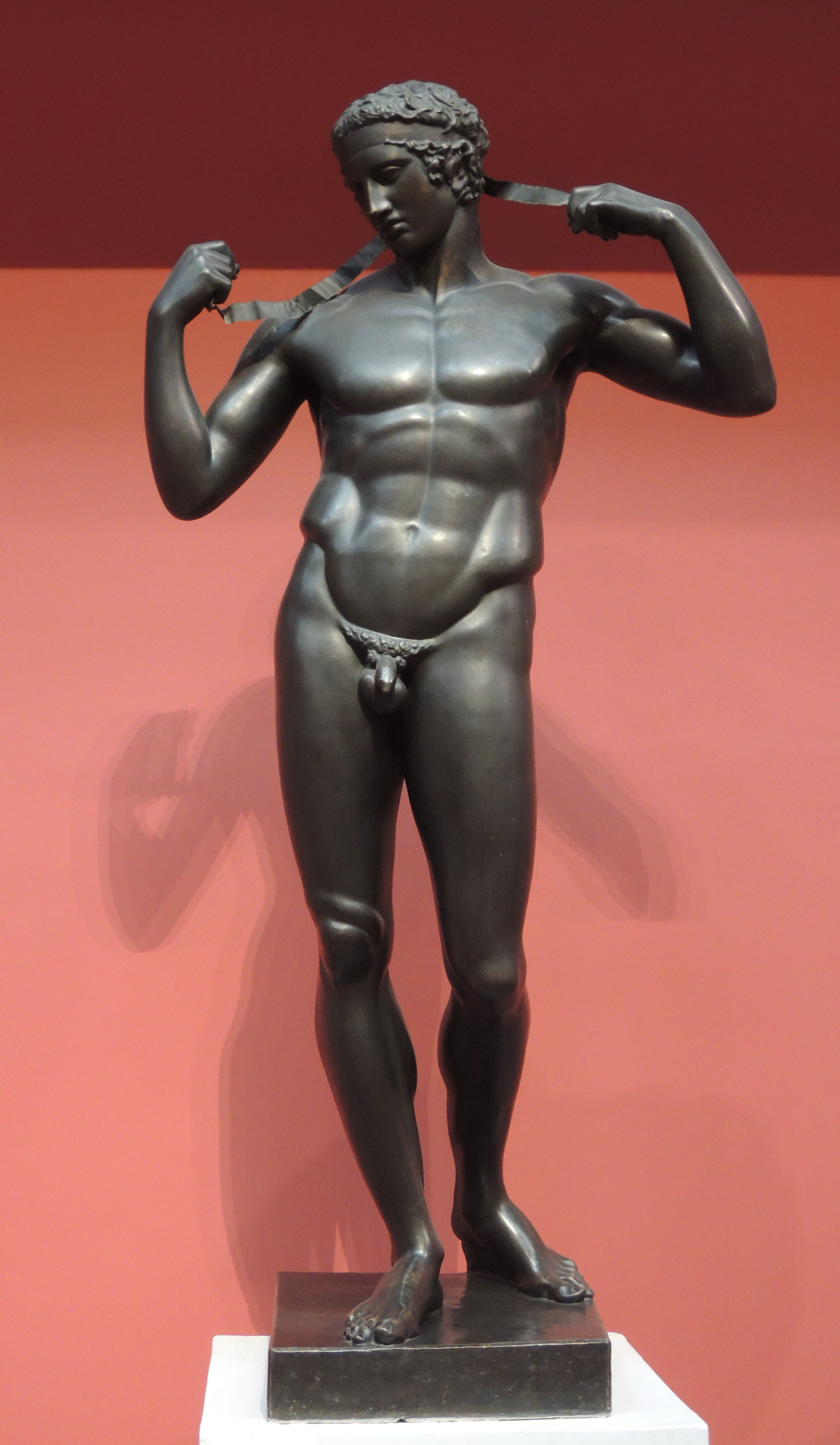
A bronze reconstruction of the Diadumenos ("The Fillet-Bearer"), a statue by Polykleitos (5th century BC), depicting a youth binding his head with fillets

A fillet is a type of headgear. It was originally worn in classical antiquity, especially in cultures of the Mediterranean, Levant and Persia, including Hellenic culture.

At that time, a fillet was a very narrow band of cloth, leather or some form of garland, frequently worn by athletes. It was also worn as a sign of royalty and became symbolized in later ages as a metallic ring which was a stylized band of cloth. Greeks called it diadema (διάδημα).

Julius Caesar refused to wear a diadema when Mark Antony offered it to him, and the Roman emperors who came after generally followed this practice until Constantine I, the first to Christianize the Roman Empire, who adopted the Greek emblem of royalty. Thereafter the diadem was worn by the Roman emperors as a symbol of sovereignty.

Earlier, it was used as a head-dress by Roman women.

Later, in medieval times, a fillet was a type of headband worn by women, usually with a wimple or barbette. This is indicated in the sign language of some monks (who took oaths of silence), wherein a sweeping motion across the brow, in the shape of a fillet, indicated an unmarried woman.

== Gallery ==
Crown of Nubkheperre Intef, pharaoh of the Seventeenth Dynasty

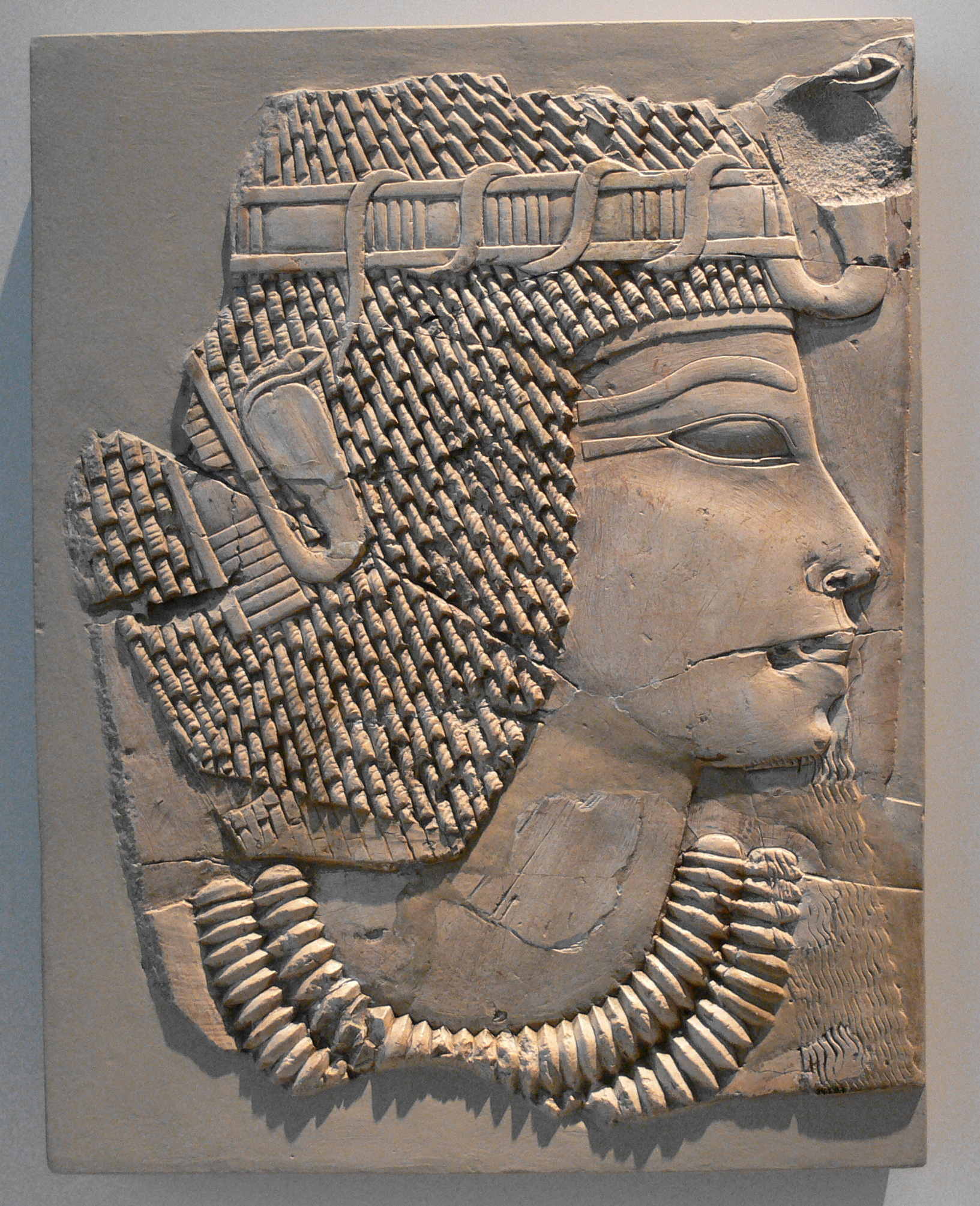
Relief of Amenhotep III, pharaoh of the Eighteenth Dynasty, wearing fillet crown

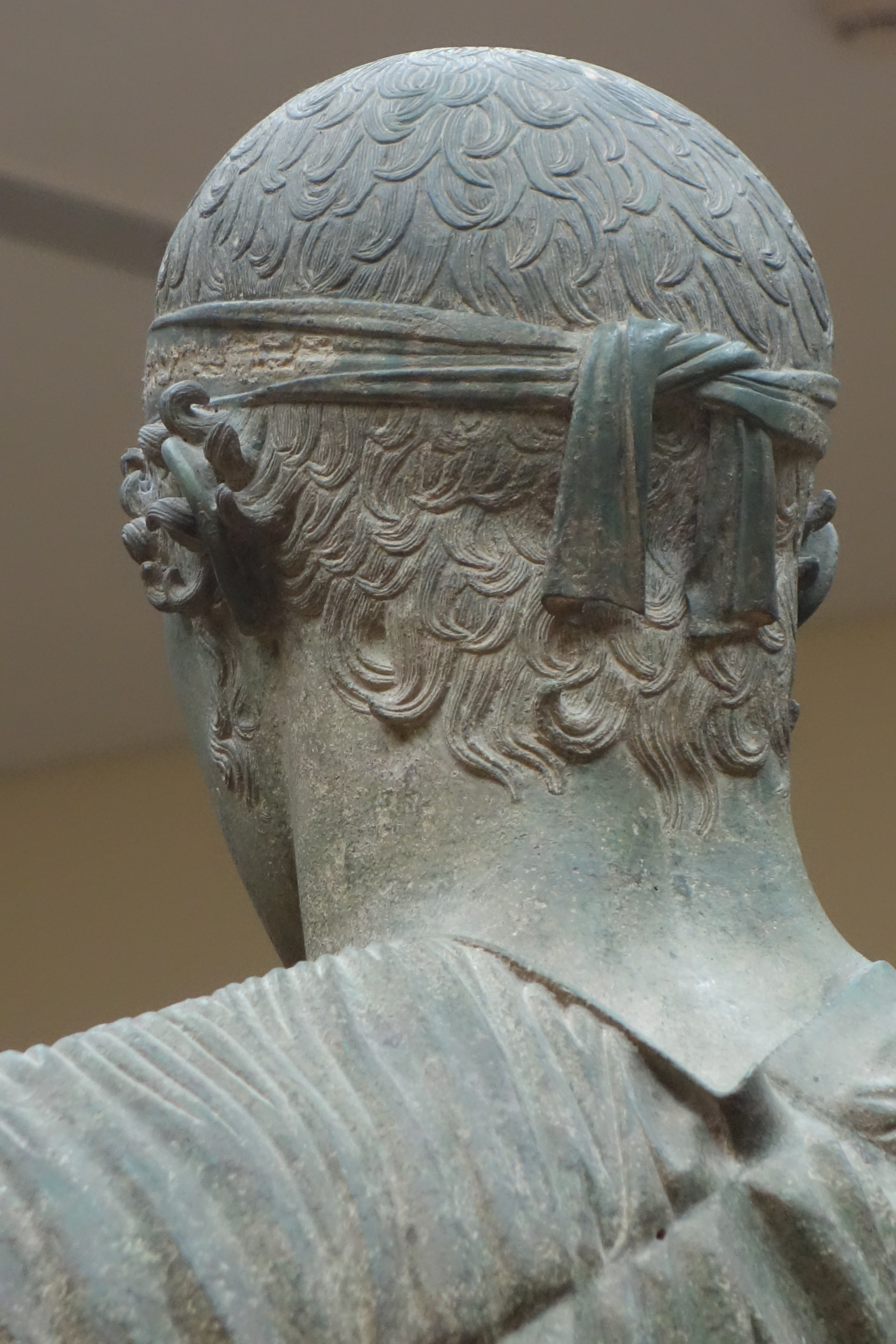
Back view of the Charioteer of Delphi's fillet (478–474 BCE)

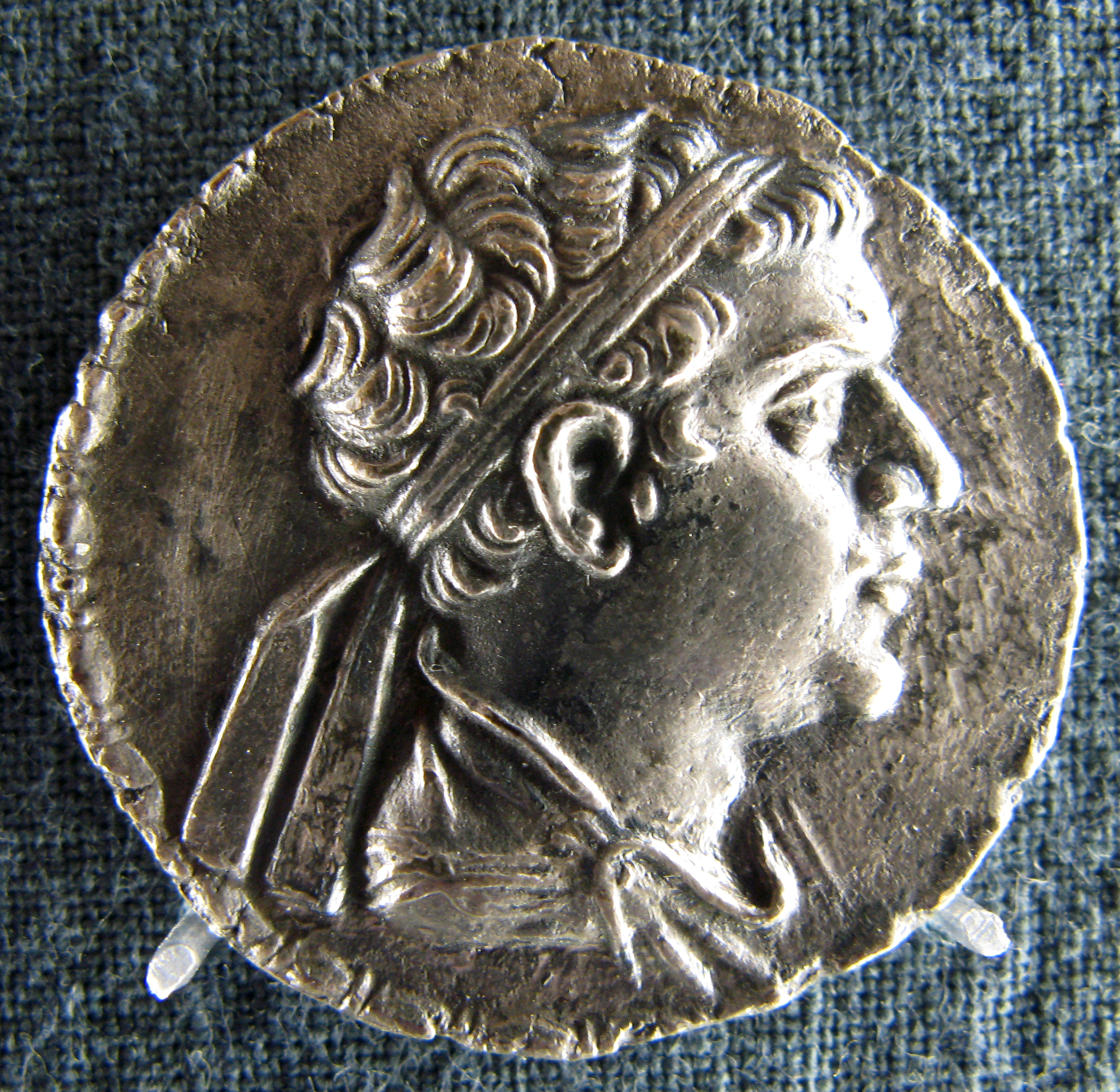
Coin of Eucratides II, Greco-Bactrian Kingdom, latter 2nd century BCE

== See also ==
- Tainia (costume) – Headband or fillet of Ancient Greece
- Hachimaki – Headband or fillet of Japan
- Wreath (attire) – Headdress made of leaves, grasses, flowers or branches
