= Alice band =

Hairstyle accessory

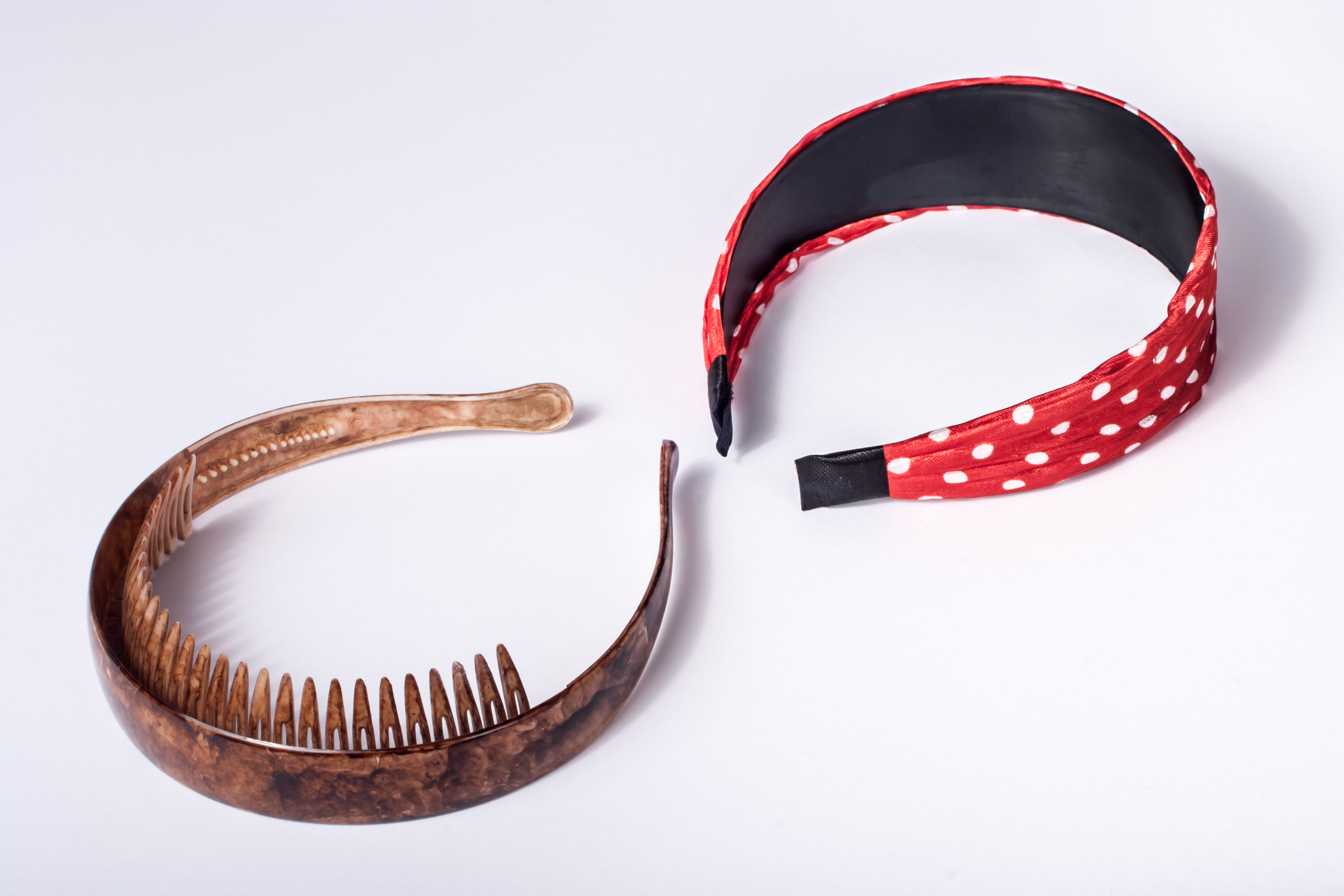
Alice bands made of plastic and stiffened fabric

An Alice band is a type of hair accessory. It can consist of flexible horseshoe-shaped plastic or elastic material forming a loop. The band is designed to fit over the head and hold long hair away from the face, but let it hang freely at the back.

== History ==
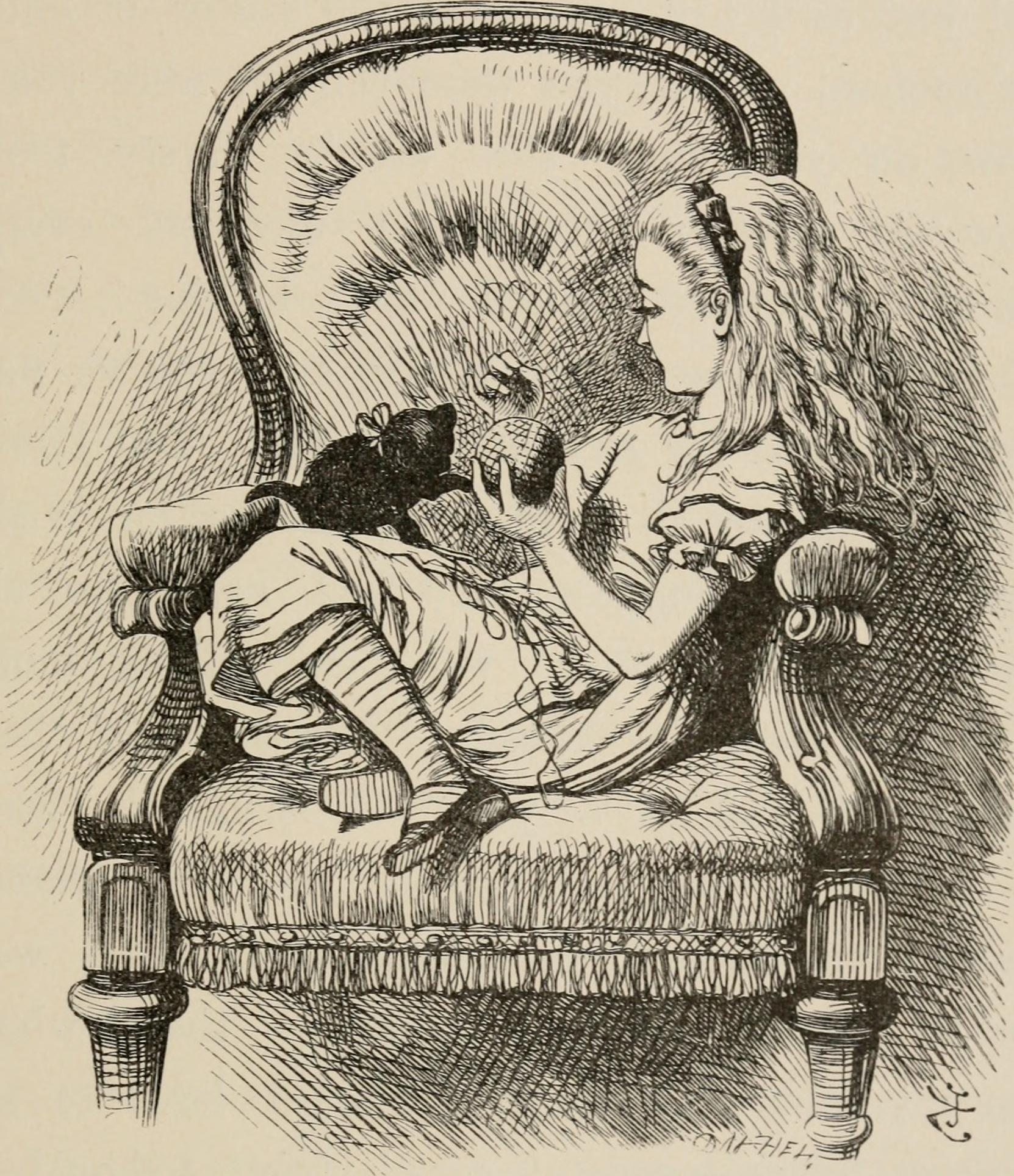
Alice, as depicted by John Tenniel in Through the Looking-Glass

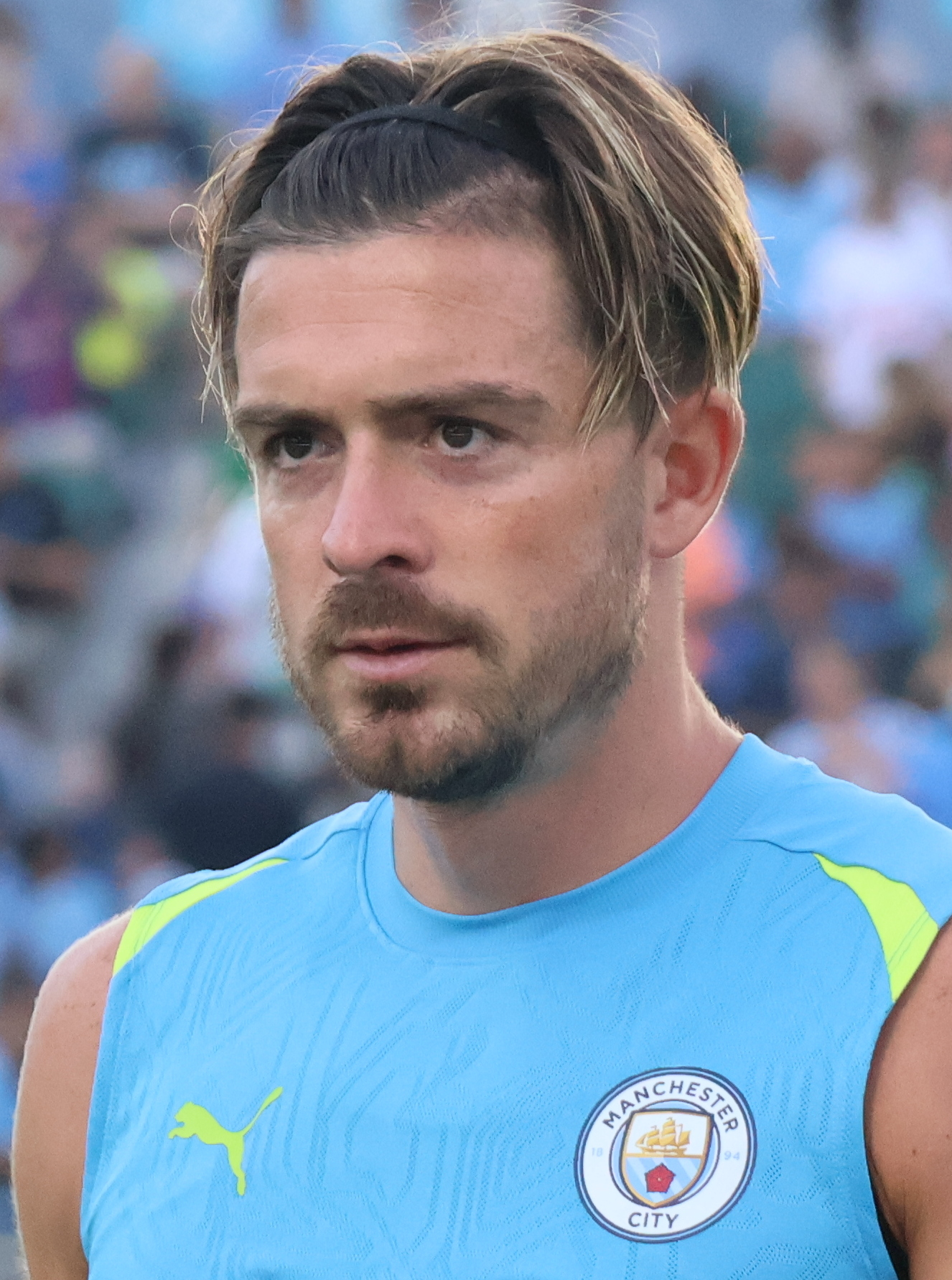
Jack Grealish wearing an Alice band

The Alice band is said to have originated in the period around 1871, following the publication of Lewis Carroll's novel Through the Looking Glass; at any rate, the name of the Alice band certainly comes from Alice, Carroll's heroine. In John Tenniel's illustrations for this book, Alice is shown wearing a ribbon which keeps her long hair away from her face.

The Alice band has had periods of popularity in adult fashion, most recently in the late 20th century, when velvet versions were popular among Sloane Rangers in the United Kingdom.

The Alice band used to be an almost universally female item of clothing, but it has gained popularity among men in some countries, being used, for example, by David Beckham and Jack Grealish.

== See also ==
- Headband or hair band, the name used in the United States
