= Deely bobber =

Novelty headband

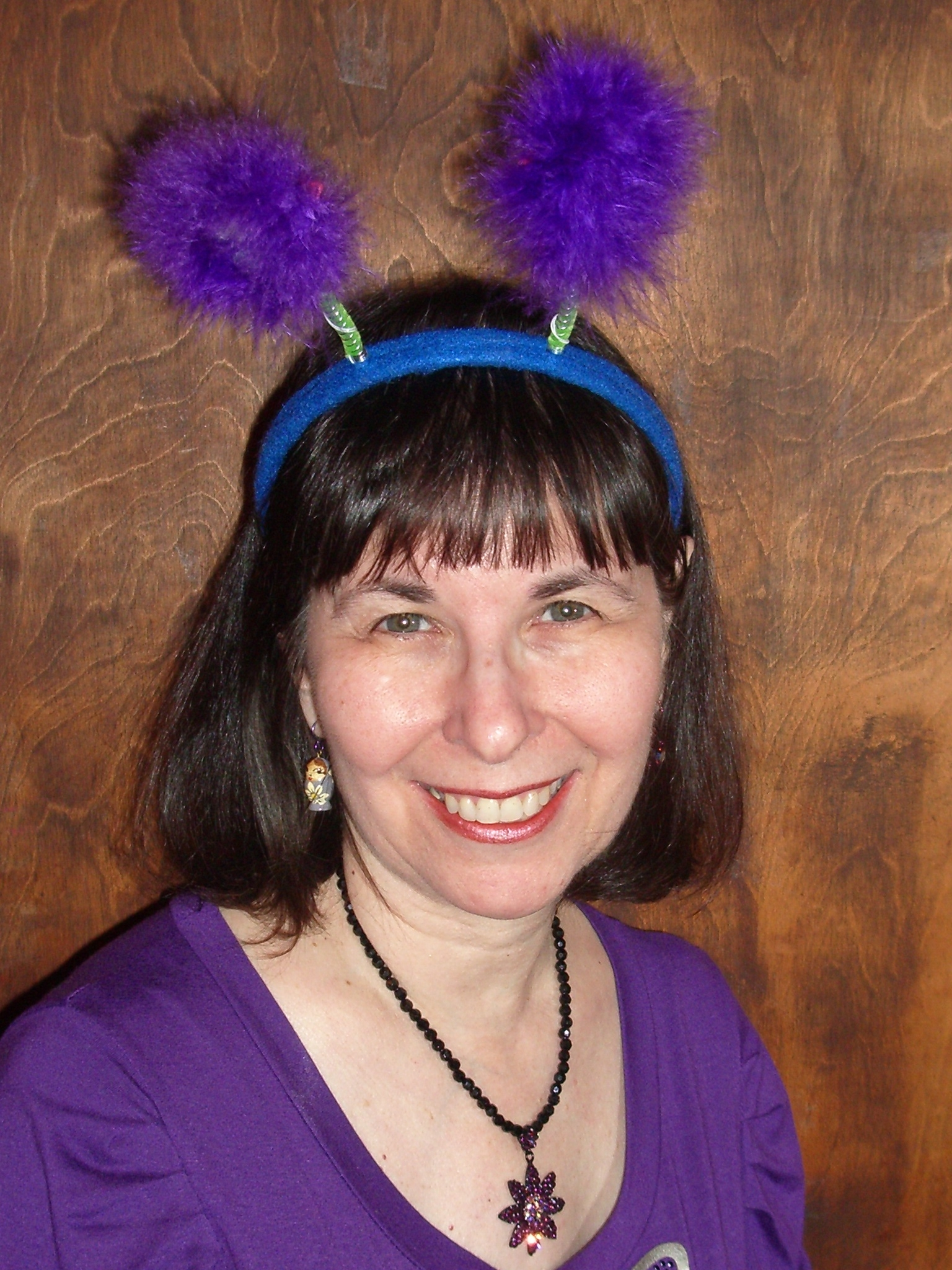
A woman wearing a deely bobber

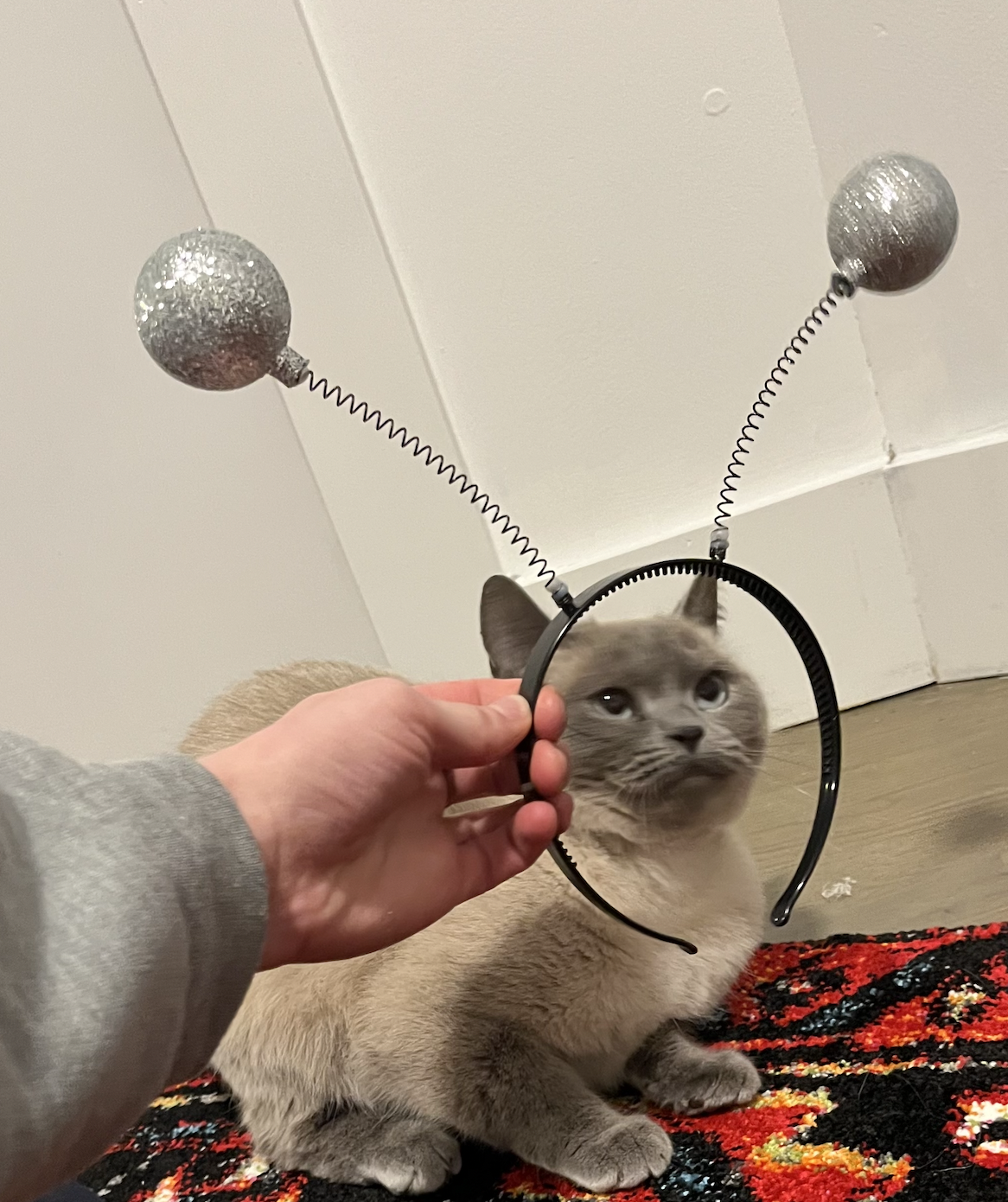
This cat's head is too small for this deely bobber.

A deely bobber (also deeley bobber or deeley bopper) is a novelty item of headgear comprising a headband to which are affixed two springy protrusions resembling the antennae of insects. These "antennae" may be topped with simple plastic shapes or more elaborate and fanciful decorations, such as mini pom poms or light-emitting diodes. The name "deely bobber" is a genericized trademark; other names include deely-boppers, bonce boppers, head boppers, or space boppers. The product was introduced in 1981 and quickly became a fad of the 1980s. In June 1982, a headline of The New York Times called them Martian antennae.

== Origin ==
Stephen Askin invented the original deely bobber in 1981, inspired by the "Killer Bees" costumes on Saturday Night Live. Askin was a former stockbroker and serial entrepreneur who had sold dartboards depicting Ayatollah Khomeini during the Iran hostage crisis of 1980. Askin made prototype Deely Bobbers in his kitchen and test-marketed them at the Los Angeles Street Fair of summer 1981, selling 800 at $5 each. He sold the invention to the Ace Novelty Co. of Bellevue, Washington, which launched it in January 1982 at the California Gift Fair. The name "Deely Bobber" was suggested by the wife of John Minkove, an Ace marketer; it had been her schoolfriend's placeholder name for "thingamajig". The name "Deelie Bobbers" had previously been used for a brand of construction toy sold by Parker Brothers between 1969 and 1973.

Deely bobbers began retailing in April 1982 at US$3 (equivalent to $10 in 2024). They quickly became a fad in the United States, before reaching the United Kingdom in July. At the 1982 World's Fair in Knoxville, Tennessee, 10,000 a day were sold; total sales by August were estimated at two million, with Askin getting 5% of the wholesale price. Imitations costing $1–2 undercut the original, though Askin applied for a patent. The original decorations for the antennae were polystyrene shapes covered in sparkles: spheres, stars, hearts. Flashing lights were added to cash in on the hit movie E.T. the Extra-Terrestrial, with seasonal themes for later holidays.
