= Eucratides II =

Greco-Bactrian king

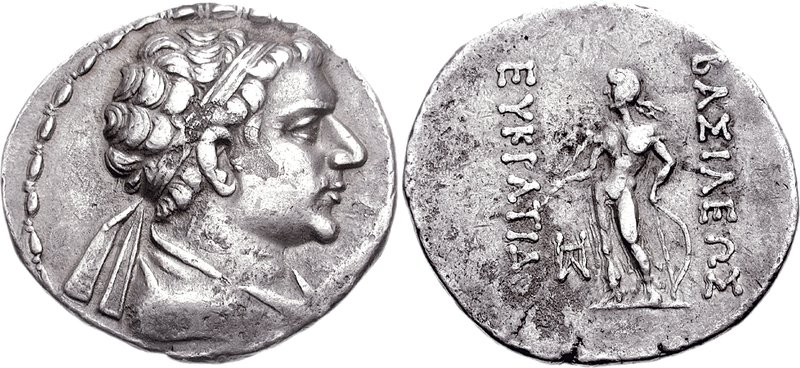
Silver tetradrachm of Eucratides II wearing a royal diadem. On the reverse nude Apollo standing facing, holding arrow in right hand, bow in left. Greek legend: ΒΑΣΙΛΕΩΣ ΕΥΚΡΑΤΙΔΟΥ Basileos Eukratidou, "Of King Eucratides".

Eucratides II (Ancient Greek: Εὐκρατίδης, romanized: Eukratidēs) was a Greco-Bactrian king of the 2nd century BC who was a successor, and probably a son, of Eucratides I.

== Reign ==
It seems likely that Eucratides II ruled for a relatively short time after the murder of his namesake, until he was dethroned in the dynastic civil war caused by the same murder, since Justin reports:

"As Eucratides returned from India, he was killed on the way back by his son, whom he had associated to his rule, and who, without hiding his patricide, as if he didn't kill a father but an enemy, ran with his chariot over the blood of his father, and ordered the corpse to be left without a sepulture" Justin 41.6

During his earlier years, Eucratides II may have been a co-regent of his father: on his later coins he adds the title Soter ("Saviour"), which could be an indication that he now ruled in his own right.

Soon after Eucratides' II death, the last Bactrian king Heliocles I was defeated by the Yuezhi tribes, who expelled the Greek kings from Bactria.

== Gallery ==
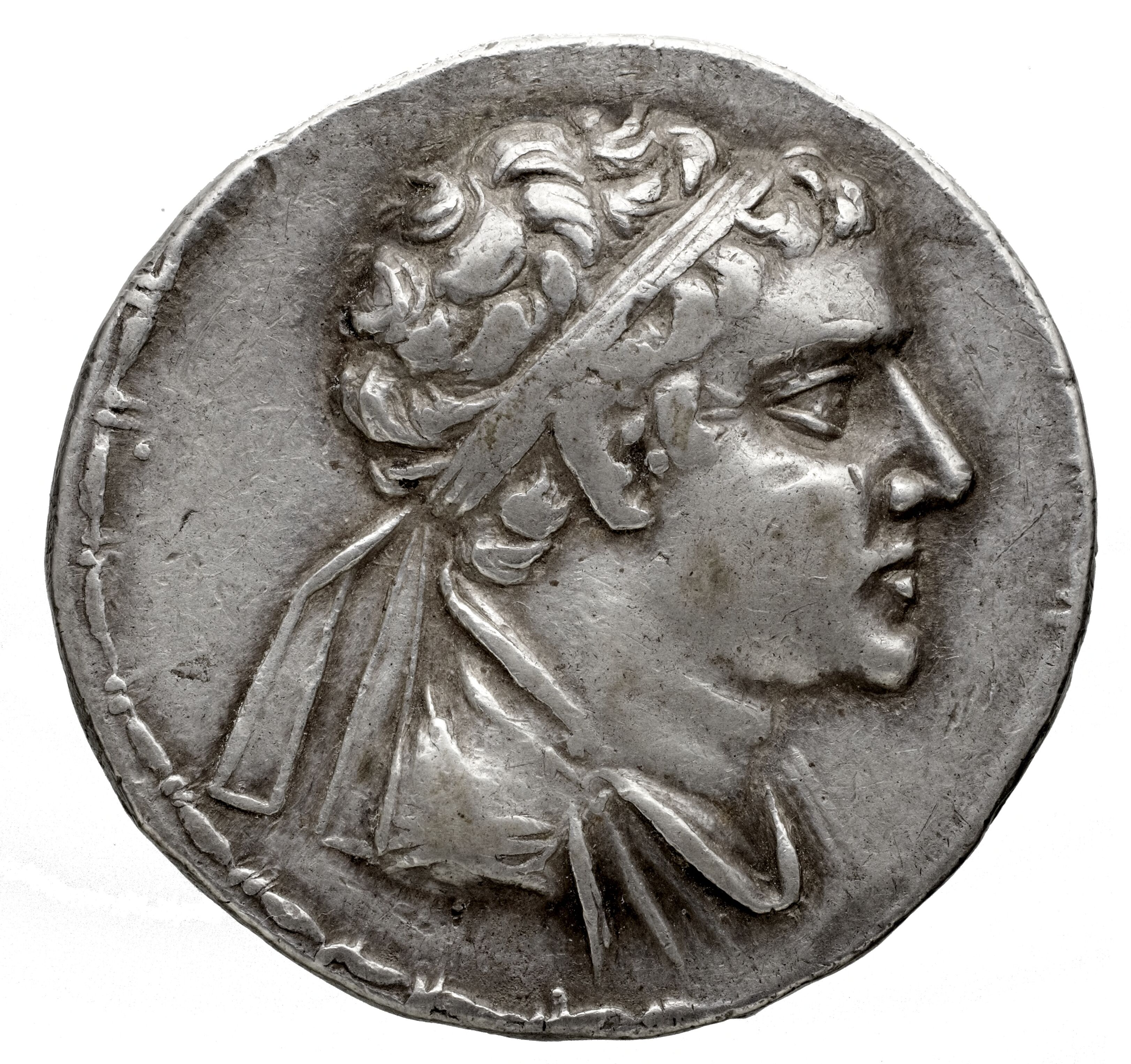
Coin of Eucratides II wearing a royal diadem.

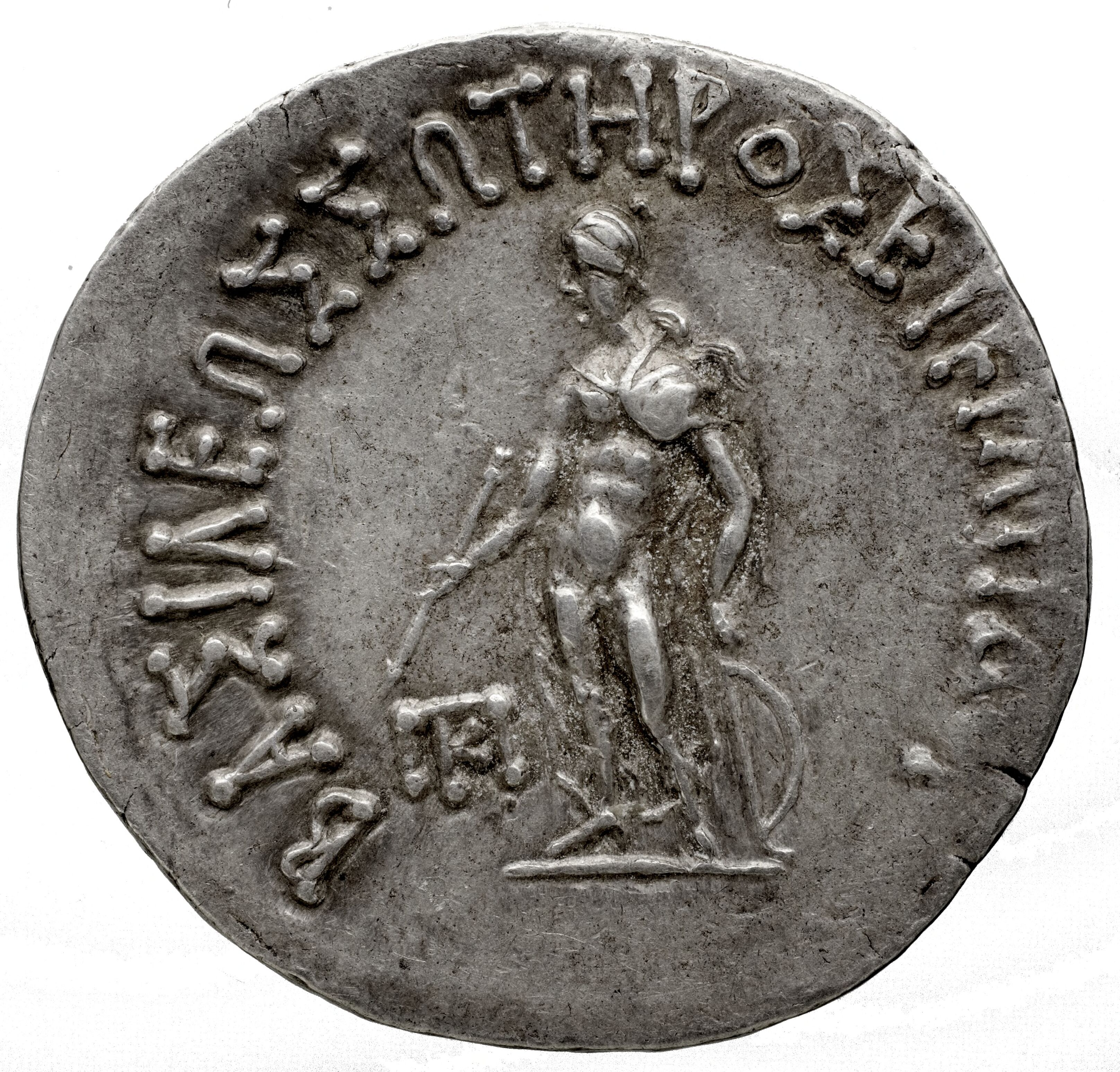
Reverse of another coin of Eucratides II. Greek legend reads: ΒΑΣΙΛΕΩΣ ΣΩΤΗΡΟΣ ΕΥΚΡΑΤΙΔΟΥ, "of king Eucratides the Saviour."

== See also ==
- Greco-Bactrian Kingdom
- Seleucid Empire
- Greco-Buddhism
- Indo-Scythians
- Indo-Parthian Kingdom
- Kushan Empire

Preceded by Eucratides I	Greco-Bactrian King (in Eastern Bactria); 145 – 140 BCE	Succeeded by Heliocles I

	Greco-Bactrian kings		Indo-Greek kings					
Territories/ dates	West Bactria	East Bactria	Paropamisade	Arachosia	Gandhara	Western Punjab	Eastern Punjab	Mathura
326-325 BCE	Campaigns of Alexander the Great in India						Nanda Empire	
312 BCE	Creation of the Seleucid Empire						Creation of the Maurya Empire	
305 BCE	Seleucid Empire after Mauryan war		Maurya Empire					
280 BCE	Foundation of Ai-Khanoum							
255–239 BCE	Independence of the Greco-Bactrian kingdom Diodotus I		Emperor Ashoka (268-232 BCE)					
239–223 BCE	Diodotus II							
230–200 BCE	Euthydemus I							
200–190 BCE	Demetrius I				Sunga Empire			
190-185 BCE	Euthydemus II							
190–180 BCE	Agathocles			Pantaleon				
185–170 BCE	Antimachus I							
180–160 BCE			Apollodotus I					
175–170 BCE	Demetrius II							
160–155 BCE			Antimachus II					
170–145 BCE	Eucratides I							
155–130 BCE	Yuezhi occupation, loss of Ai-Khanoum	Eucratides II; Plato; Heliocles I	Menander I					
130–120 BCE	Yuezhi occupation		Zoilus I		Agathoclea			Yavanarajya inscription
120–110 BCE			Lysias		Strato I			Yavanarajya inscription
110–100 BCE			Antialcidas		Heliocles II			Yavanarajya inscription
100 BCE			Polyxenus		Demetrius III			Yavanarajya inscription
100–95 BCE			Philoxenus					Yavanarajya inscription
95–90 BCE			Diomedes	Amyntas		Epander		Yavanarajya inscription
90 BCE			Theophilus	Peucolaus		Thraso		Yavanarajya inscription
90–85 BCE			Nicias	Menander II		Artemidorus		Yavanarajya inscription
90–70 BCE			Hermaeus	Archebius				Yavanarajya inscription
			Yuezhi occupation		Maues (Indo-Scythian)			
75–70 BCE				Vonones	Telephus	Apollodotus II		
65–55 BCE				Spalirises		Hippostratus	Dionysius	
55–35 BCE					Azes I (Indo-Scythians)		Zoilus II	
55–35 BCE					Vijayamitra/ Azilises		Apollophanes	
25 BCE – 10 CE				Gondophares	Zeionises	Kharahostes	Strato II; Strato III	
				Gondophares (Indo-Parthian)			Rajuvula (Indo-Scythian)	
			Kujula Kadphises (Kushan Empire)				Bhadayasa (Indo-Scythian)	Sodasa (Indo-Scythian)
