= Tainia (costume) =

Headband or fillet of Ancient Greece

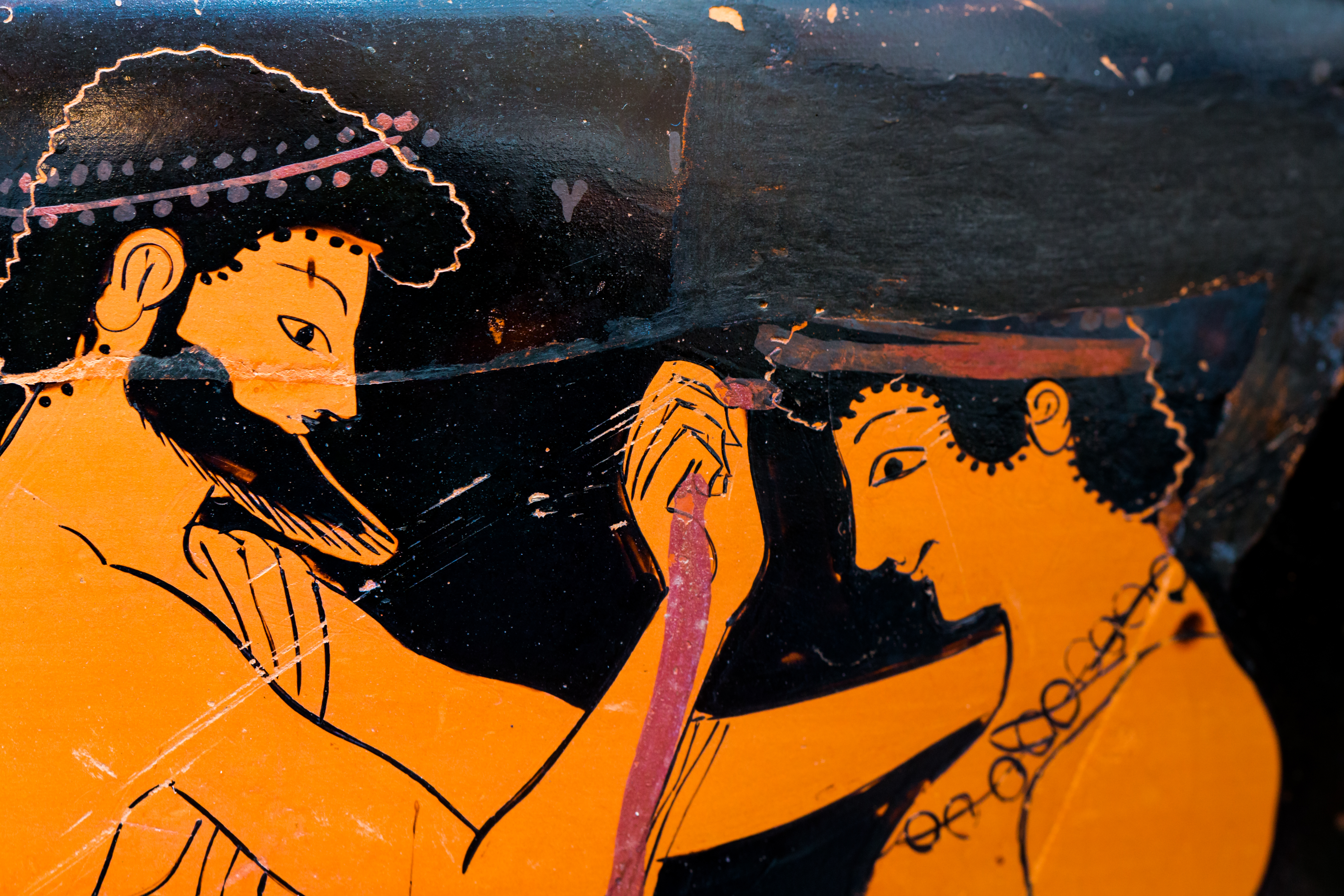
Judge awarding the tainia to a young athlete, detail from an Attic red-figure hydria (510–500 BCE)

In ancient Greek costume, a tainia (Ancient Greek: ταινία; pl.: ταινίαι or Latin: taenia; pl.: taeniae) was a headband, ribbon, or fillet.

The tainia headband was worn with the traditional ancient Greek costume. The headbands were worn at Greek festivals. The gods also bound their heads with tainiai.

Cult images, trees, urns, monuments, animal sacrifices and the deceased had tainiai wound around them. They were later adopted by the Romans. A similar type of headband was the diadema, used as a symbol for kings.

== Tainia in art ==
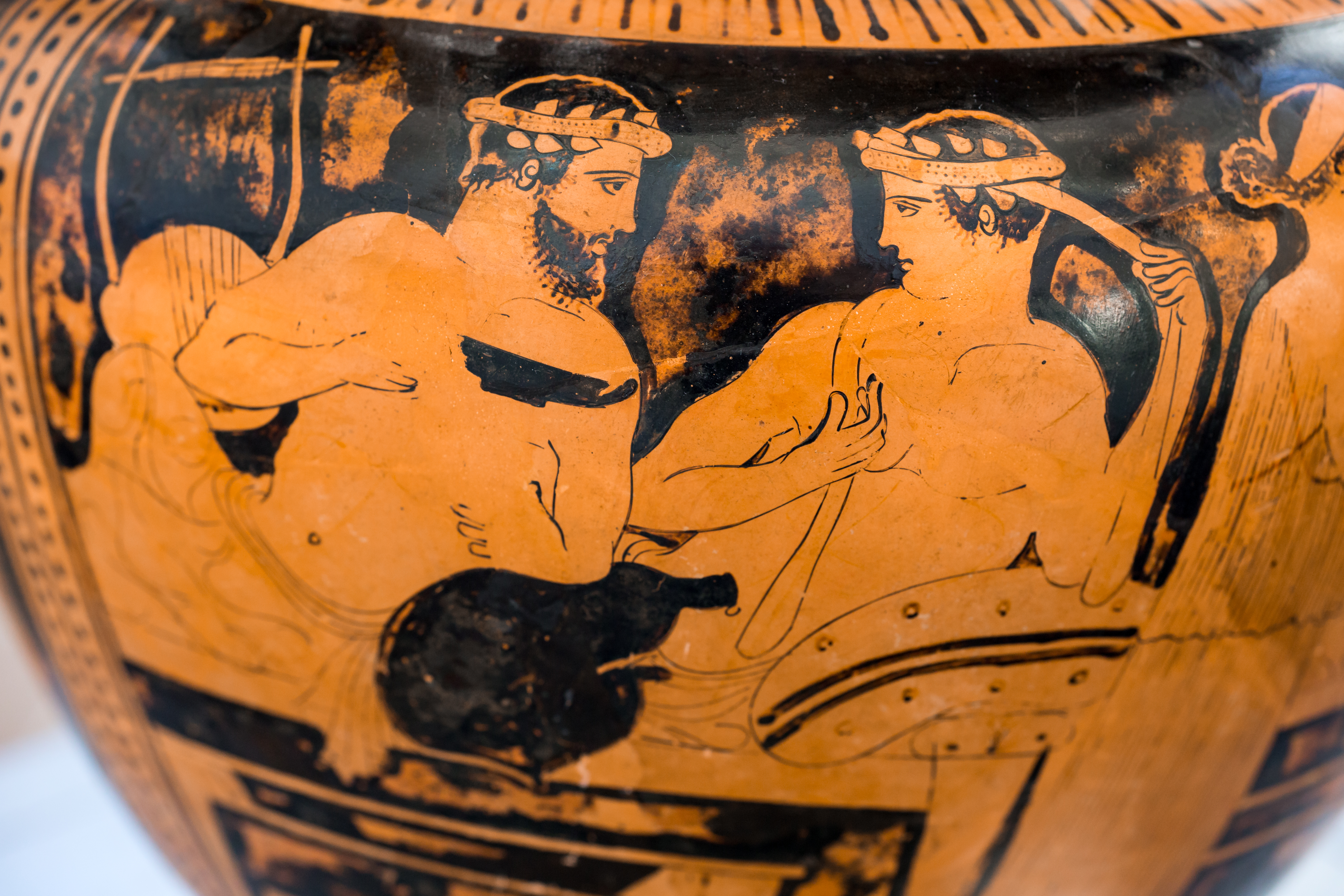
Coy symposiast playing with his taenia, 450–440 BCE

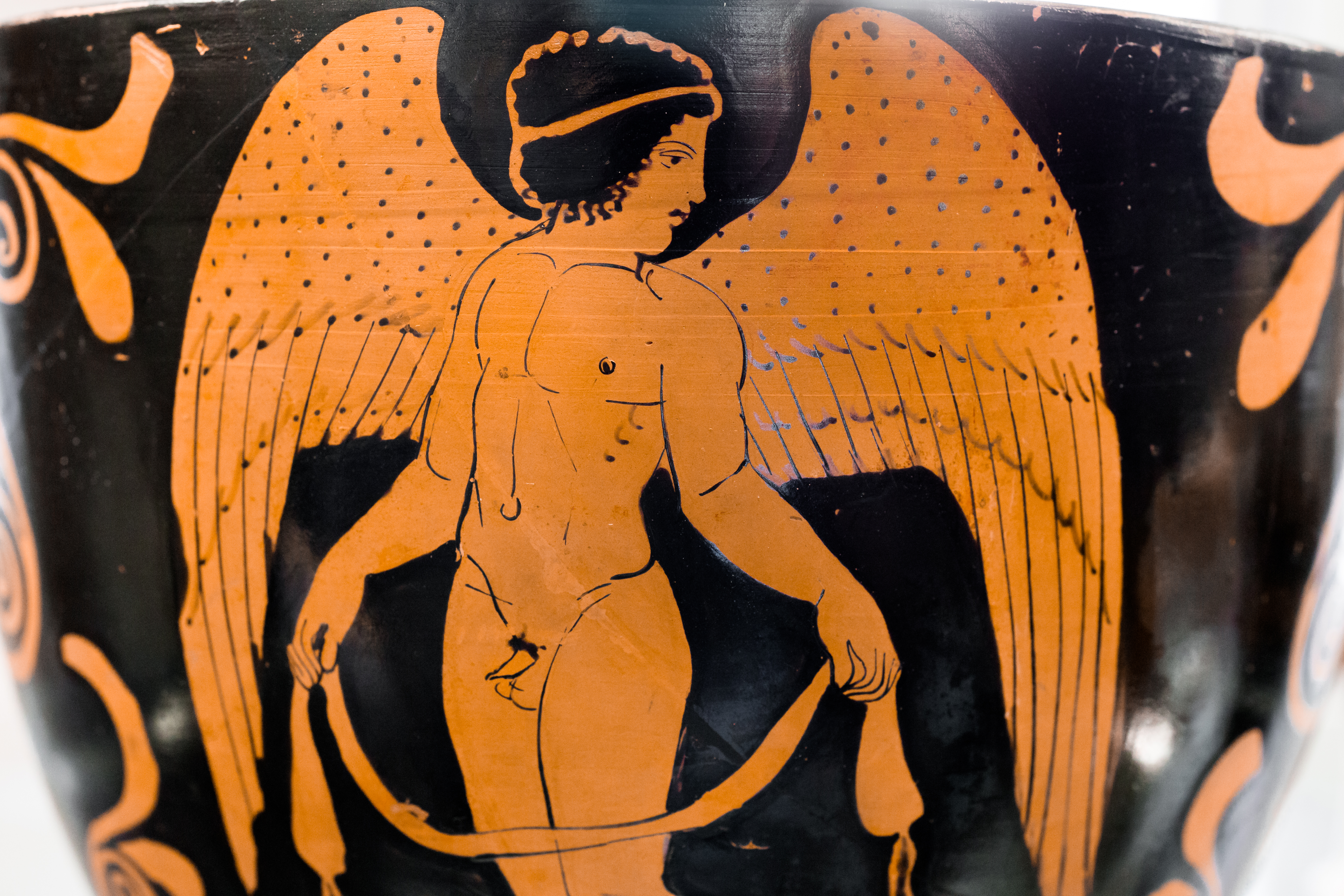
Eros bearing tainia, red-figure skyphos, Lucania 420–400 BCE

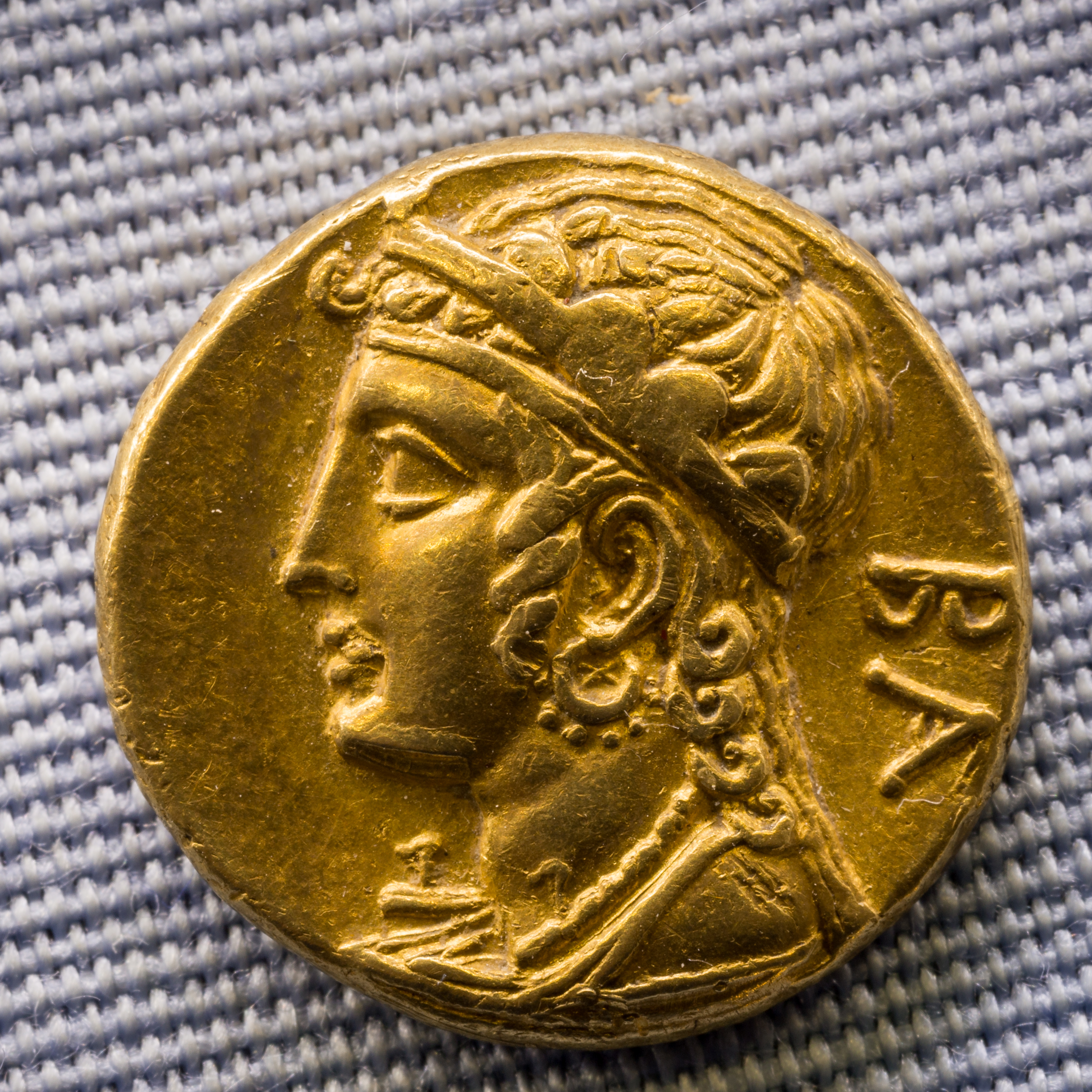
Cyprian Aphrodite coiffed with diadem and tainia, 351-332 BCE

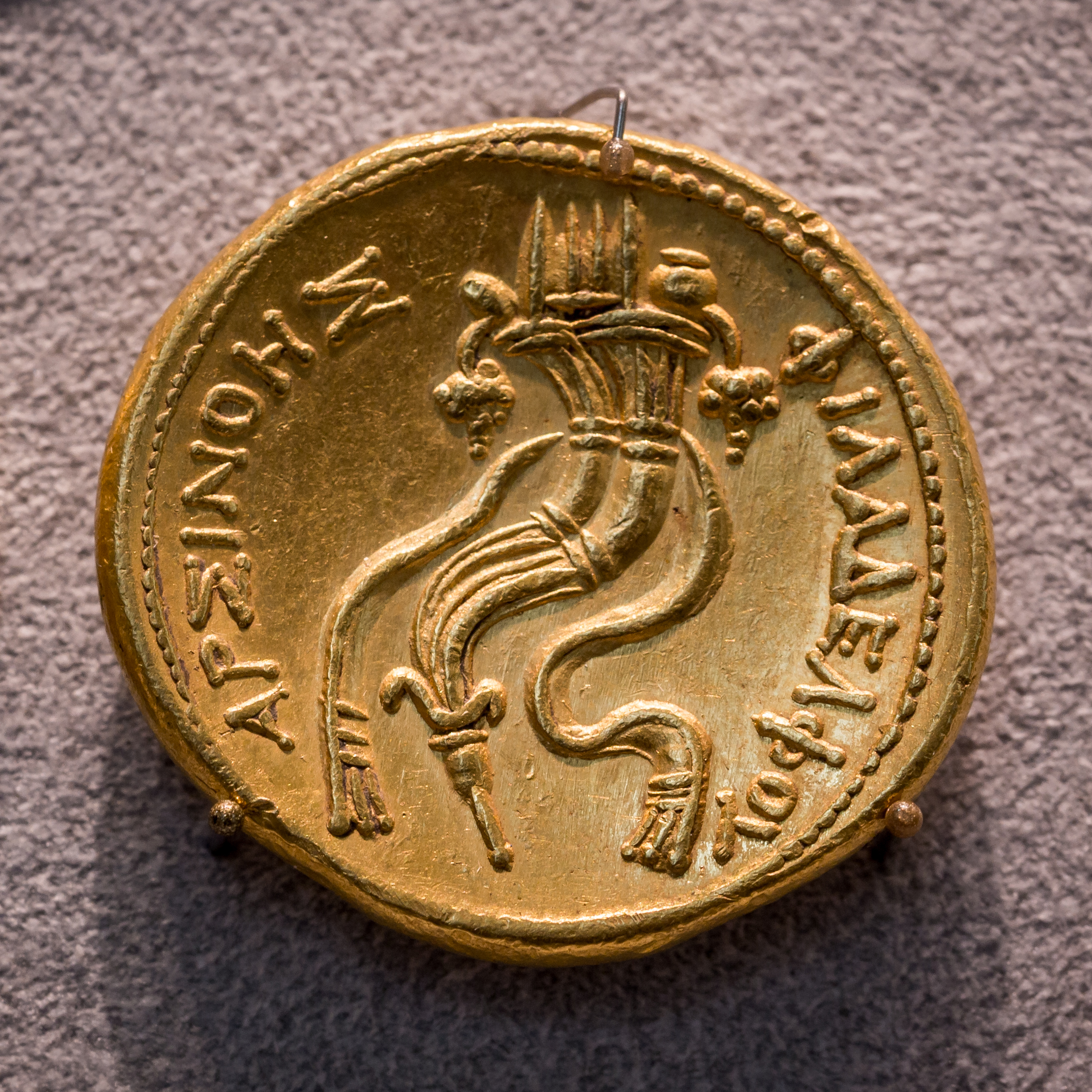
Tainia-bound double cornucopia, Ptolemaic Egypt, 283–246 BCE

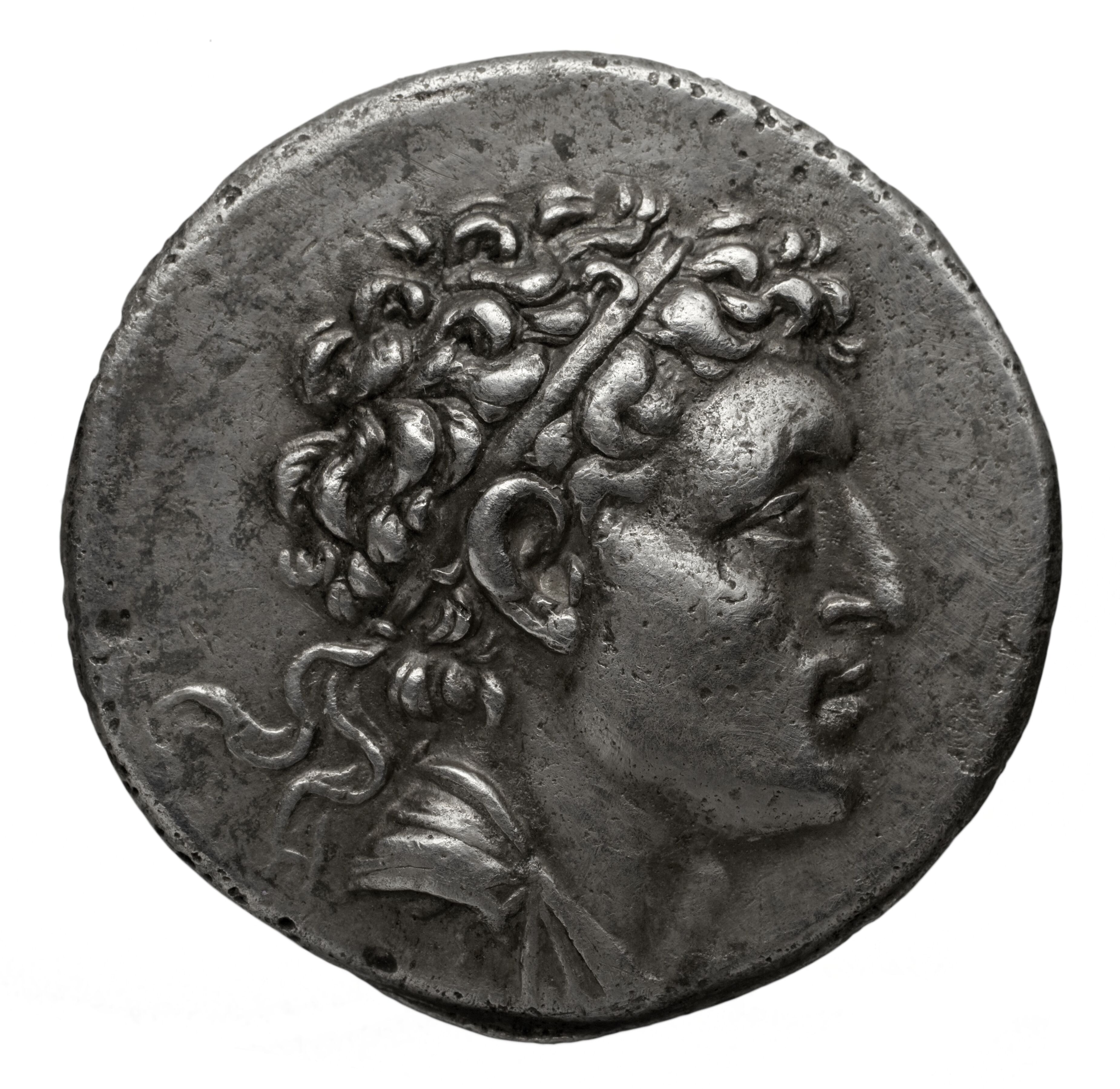
Tetradrachm of Eumenes II, 2nd century BCE

== See also ==
- Clothing in ancient Greece
- Fillet (clothing)
- Wreath (attire)
