= Headbands of Hope =

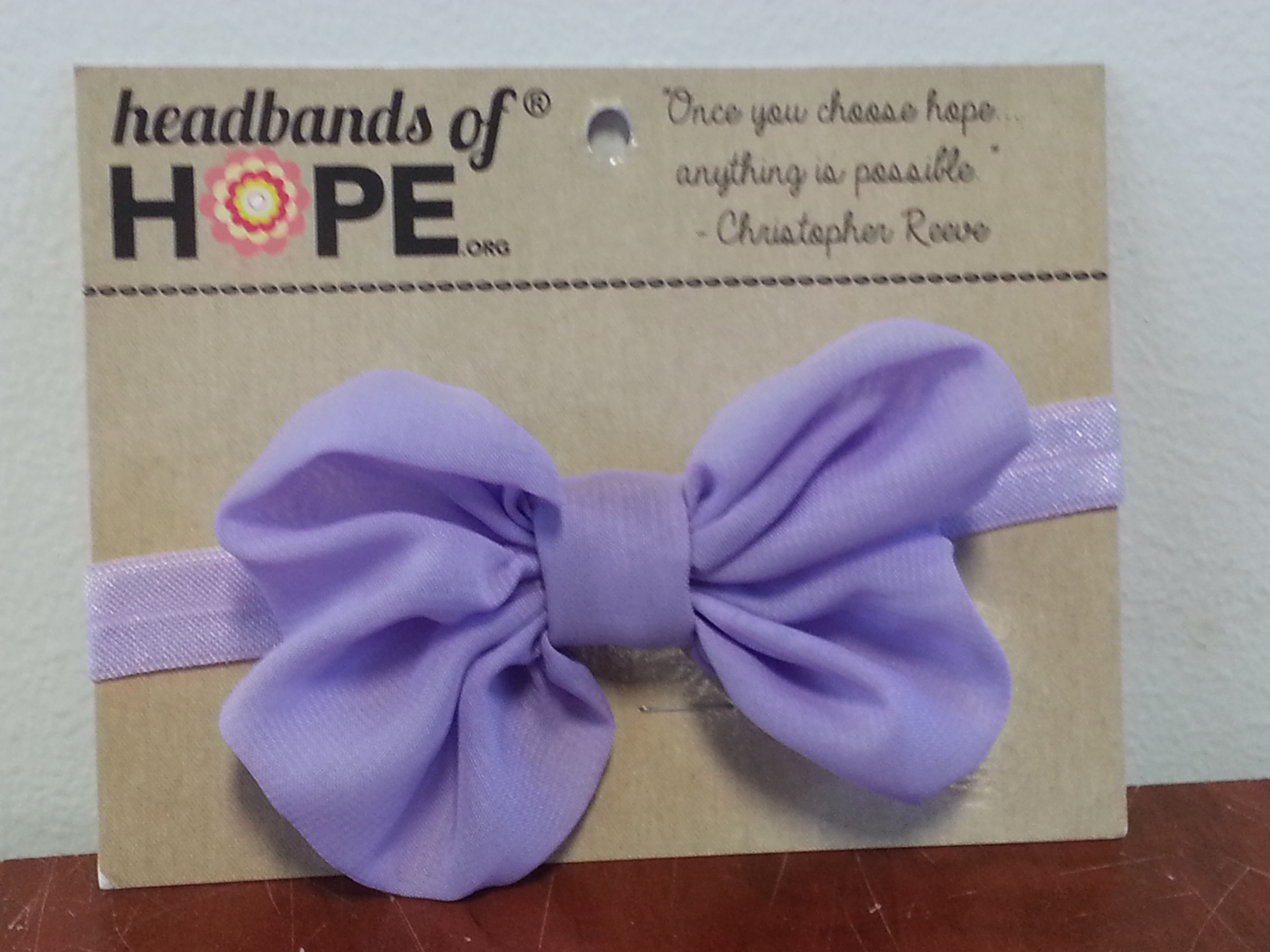
- Founded: April 2012; 14 years ago
- Founder: Jessica Ekstrom, CEO
- Location: Raleigh, North Carolina
- Region served: United States
- Website: www.headbandsofhope.org

Headbands of Hope, LLC is an organization founded by Jessica Ekstrom. For every item sold, a headband is donated to a child battling cancer. Since its launch in 2012, Headbands of Hope has donated over 1 million headbands to hospitals across the United States and in twenty-two countries. Headbands of Hope products are available in thousands of stores across the world. Headbands of Hope operates as a for-profit organization.

== History ==
Headbands of Hope was created by Ekstrom after an internship at the Make-A-Wish Foundation in 2011. Noticing the popularity of headbands over wigs with girls battling cancer, Ekstrom created a product specifically for these children. The organization launched in April 2012, and by January 31, 2013, the organization had donated more than 3,000 headbands. TOMS Shoes, a supporter of the organization, provided the business model of sending the headbands to hospitals, rather than individual patients. The company has expanded to sell other hair accessories as well, such as claw clips and hats in more recent years. In 2019 the program was expanded to include children with illnesses other than cancer, as they had more headbands to donate than recipients.

== Production ==
The headbands are tagged and branded in their warehouse in Cornelius, North Carolina. This location was chosen by Ekstrom with help from the Colleges of Design and Textiles at North Carolina State University, her alma mater.

== Marketing ==
The headbands are marketed by representatives on college campuses. The "Hope Club," allows cancer patients who have received headbands to post photos and biographies.

Recently, the organization has started marketing more general headwear through Headwear of Hope, donating headwear to young boys undergoing cancer treatment. In addition to the headwear, the organization donates $1 for each item purchased to the St. Baldrick's Foundation .
