= Roman military decorations and punishments =

Roman military behaviors

As with most other military forces the Roman military adopted an extensive list of decorations for military gallantry and likewise a range of punishments for military transgressions.

== Decorations, awards and victory titles ==
=== Crowns ===
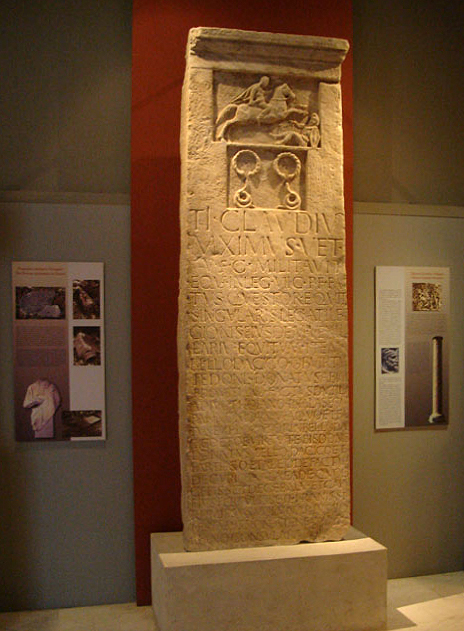
Tiberius Claudius Maximus memorial showing two awards he received

- Grass crown – (Latin: corona obsidionalis or corona graminea), was the highest and rarest of all military decorations. It was presented only to a general, commander, or officer whose actions saved the legion or the entire army.
- Civic crown – (Latin: corona civica), was a chaplet of common oak leaves woven to form a crown. During the Roman Republic, and the subsequent Principate, it was regarded as the second highest military decoration a citizen could aspire to (the Grass Crown being held in higher regard) and was rewarded for saving the lives of fellow Roman citizens (cives) or for standing one's ground in war. Since Augustus, only the princeps was eligible for this decoration. It may have been identical to the Crown of the Preserver mentioned below.
- Naval crown – (Latin: corona navalis), was a gold crown awarded to the first man who boarded an enemy ship during a naval engagement. In style, the crown was made of gold and surmounted with the beaks of ships.
- Gold crown – (Latin: corona aurea), was awarded to both centurions and potentially some principales, for killing an enemy in single combat and holding the ground to the end of the battle.
- Battlement crowns – These were made of gold and decorated with the uprights (valli) of an entrenchment or turrets of a city. It was awarded to the first soldier or centurion to mount the wall or palisade of an enemy town or camp.
  - Mural crown – (Latin: corona muralis), also referred to as the "walled crown", this was a golden crown, or circle of gold intended to resemble a battlement, bestowed upon the first soldier who climbed the wall of a besieged city and to successfully place the standard of the attacking army upon it.
  - Camp crown – (Latin: corona vallaris or corona castrensis), a golden crown which was ornamented with the palisades used in forming an entrenchment, given to the first man who penetrated into an enemy camp or field during combat.
- Crown of the Preserver – awarded to "those who have shielded and saved any of the citizens or allies" – Polybius relates that the crown is presented by those civilians the soldier saved and adds that "the man thus preserved also reverences his preserver as a father all through his life, and must treat him in every way like a parent."

=== Imperial titles ===
==== Synonyms for "Emperor" ====
- Augustus (also "Αὔγουστος" or "Σεβαστός"), "Majestic" or "Venerable"; an honorific cognomen exclusive to the emperor
  - Αὐτοκράτωρ, (lit. 'Self-ruler'); Greek title equivalent to imperator i.e. Commander-in-Chief
  - Βασιλεύς (Basileus), Greek title meaning sovereign, popularly used in the east to refer to the emperor; a formal title of the Roman emperor beginning with Heraclius
- Caesar (also "Καίσαρ" or "Nobilissimus Caesar"), "Caesar" or "Most Noble Caesar"; an honorific name later used to identify an Emperor-designate
- Censor, a Republican office with a five-year term and one coequal officeholder
- Consul, the highest magistracy of the Roman republic with a one-year term and one coequal officeholder
- Dominus, "Lord" or "Master"; an honorific title popular in the Empire's middle history
- Imperator, "Commander" or "Commander-in-Chief"; a victory title taken on accession to the purple and after a major military victory; the praenomen of most Roman emperors
- Imperator Destinatus, "Destined to be Emperor"; heir apparent, used by Septimius Severus for Caracalla.
- Imperium maius, "greater imperium"; absolute power to a degree greater than any other, including power of enacting capital punishment
- Invictus, "Unconquered"; an honorific title
- Pater Patriae, "Father of the Fatherland"; an honorific title
- Pius Felix, "Pious and Blessed" (lit. 'Dutiful and Happy'); an honorific title
- Pontifex Maximus, "Supreme Pontiff" or "Chief Priest" (lit. 'Greatest Bridgemaker'); a title and office of Republican origin – could not be used by Christian Emperors, while by that time only the pope had a claim on the title of highest religious authority.
- Princeps, "First Citizen" or "Leading Citizen"; an honorific title denoting the status of the emperor as first among equals
- Princeps Iuventatis, "First of Youth"; an honorific title awarded to a presumptive Emperor-designate
- Princeps Senatus, "First Man of the Senate" a Republican office with a five-year term
- Restitutor Orbis, "Restorer of the World"; a title granted to Aurelian for his role in helping to end the Crisis of the Third Century.
- Tribunicia potestas, "tribunician power"; the powers of a tribune of the people including sacrosanctity and the veto

==== Victory titles ====
Victory titles were treated as Latin cognomina and were usually the name of the enemy defeated by the commander. Hence, names like Africanus ("the African"), Numidicus ("the Numidian"), Isauricus ("the Isaurian"), Creticus ("the Cretan"), Gothicus ("the Goth"), Germanicus ("the German") and Parthicus ("the Parthian"), seemingly out of place for ardently patriotic Romans, are in fact expressions of Roman superiority over these peoples. The most famous grantee of Republican victory title was Publius Cornelius Scipio, who for his great victories in the Second Punic War was awarded by the Roman Senate the title "Africanus" and is thus known to history as "Scipio Africanus".

The practice continued in the Roman Empire, although it was subsequently amended by some Roman Emperors who desired to emphasise the totality of their victories by adding Maximus ("the Greatest") to the victory title (e.g., Parthicus Maximus, "the Greatest Parthian").

=== Decorations (medal equivalents) ===
Polybius writes that "After a battle in which some of them have distinguished themselves, the general calls an assembly of the troops, and bringing forward those whom he considers to have displayed conspicuous valour, first of all speaks in laudatory terms of the courageous deeds of each and of anything else in their previous conduct which deserves commendation". Only after this are the military decorations presented:

- Torc – gold necklet
- Armillae – gold armbands
- Phalerae – gold, silver, or bronze sculpted disks worn on the breastplate during parades
- Hasta pura or Arrow without a Head- a ceremonial silver spear awarded to "the man who has wounded an enemy". The use of this decoration is not clear. (Note: Some sources call it a civilian award. See the main article.)
- a small silver replica of a standard or flag (the vexillum).
- a cup – presented to an infantryman "who has slain and stripped an enemy" not in the normal melee of battle but voluntarily in single combat after throwing themselves into danger
- "horse trappings" – presented to a cavalryman "who has slain and stripped an enemy" not in the normal melee of battle but voluntarily in single combat after throwing themselves into danger

=== Financial awards ===
- monetary bonuses
- part of the loot and spoils after a conquest including slaves

=== Service awards ===
- missio honesta – honorable discharge

=== Trophy ===
- Spolia opima
- Tropaion

=== Imperial parades ===
- Triumph – a civil ceremony and religious rite of ancient Rome, held to publicly honour the military commander (dux) of a notably successful foreign war or campaign and to display the glories of Roman victory.
- Ovation – a less-honored form of the Roman triumph. Ovations were granted when war was not declared between enemies on the level of states, when an enemy was considered basely inferior (slaves, pirates), and when the general conflict was resolved with little to no bloodshed or danger to the army itself.

== Punishments ==
When the Roman soldier enrolled in service to the state, he swore a military oath known as the sacramentum: originally to the Senate and Roman People, later to the general and the emperor. The sacramentum stated that he would fulfill his conditions of service on pain of punishment up to and inclusive of death. Discipline in the army was extremely rigorous by modern standards, and the general had the power to summarily execute any soldier under his command.

Polybius divides the punishments inflicted by a commander on one or more troops into punishments for military crimes, and punishments for "unmanly acts", although there seems to be little difference in the harsh nature of the punishment between the two classes.

=== Punishments for crimes ===
- Fustuarium or bastinado — Following a court-martial sentence for desertion or dereliction of duty, the soldier would be stoned, or beaten to death by cudgels, in front of the assembled troops, by his fellow soldiers, whose lives had been put in danger. Soldiers under sentence of fustuarium who escaped were not pursued, but lived under sentence of banishment from Rome. Polybius writes that the fustuarium is "also inflicted on those who steal anything from the camp; on those who give false evidence; on young men who have abused their persons; and finally on anyone who has been punished thrice for the same fault."
- Pecunaria multa – fines or deductions from the pay allowance.
- Flogging in front of the century, cohort or legion.
- "demanding sureties", including the re-taking of the military oath known as the sacramentum.
- For treason or theft, the punishment would most probably be being placed in a sack of snakes and thrown into a nearby river or lake.

Another punishment in the Roman Military only applied to people involved in the prison system; this rule was that if a prisoner died due to the punishment inflicted by Roman legionaries, unless he was given the death penalty, then the leader of the troops would be given the same punishment.

It would seem that in the later Empire independent commanders were given considerable latitude in the crimes they chose to punish and the penalties they inflicted. According to the Historia Augusta the future Emperor Aurelian once ordered a man who was convicted of raping the wife of the man on whom he had been billeted to be attached to two trees drawn together so that when the restraining ropes were cut, they sprang apart and the unfortunate victim was torn asunder. The author of the Vita Aureliani comments that Aurelian rarely punished twice for the same offence. However, even by Roman standards his justice was considered particularly harsh. As always with the Historia Augusta, one takes this story with a pinch of salt and either wonders what fourth century point the author was attempting to make of a third-century incident or whether he merely attributed to Aurelian a good story that seemed appropriate to that man's reputation. On the other hand, the imposition of cruel and unusual penalties to maintain discipline among the brutalised soldiery in the chaotic conditions of the north European provinces in the mid-third century was a necessity for the maintenance of effective command. (Note: The soldier in question was a billetee – i.e. not living in one of the Roman Army's permanent cantonments. This suggests that his unit was on detached service – always a recipe for relaxed discipline and undesirable interaction with the civilian population.)

=== Punishments for unmanly acts ===
- Decimatio – a form of extreme military discipline used by officers in the Roman Army to punish mutinous or cowardly soldiers in exceptional cases. A cohort selected for punishment by decimation was divided into groups of ten; each group cast lots, and the soldier on whom the lot fell was executed by his nine comrades, often by stoning or clubbing. The remaining soldiers were given rations of barley instead of wheat and forced to sleep outside of the Roman encampment. This punishment was forgotten over time since the early Republic, but the ancient punishment was resurrected by Marcus Crassus during the Spartacus gladiator rebellion in 72 BC, when two of his legions disobeyed his direct orders not to engage the enemy. As a result, they suffered a terrible defeat. Crassus's response to the disobedience was brutal: he assembled the two legions and pulled out every 10th man as he walked across the ranks, and each man who was pulled out was to be beaten to death by his preceding nine comrades. Some scholars say that Julius Caesar joined these two legions to form his legendary "Legio X Equitata".

According to Cassius Dio as re-told by Matthew Dennison, the newly-appointed emperor Galba revived this punishment to deal with a contingent of rebellious soldiers who confronted him as he entered Rome at the Milvian Bridge in autumn of 68 AD. Dio states that Galba ordered this punishment because "he did not believe that an emperor should submit to compulsion in anything."

- Castigatio – being hit by the centurion with his staff or animadversio fustium
- Reduction of rations, or to be forced to eat barley instead of the usual grain ration
- Whipping with the flagrum (flagellum, flagella), or "short whip" — a much more brutal punishment than simple flogging. The "short whip" was used for slave volunteers, volones.
- gradus deiectio – a reduction in rank
- Loss of advantages gained from length of service.
- militiae mutatio – relegation to inferior service or duties.
- Summary execution
- munerum indictio – additional duties

== Bibliography ==
- Maxfield, Valerie A. (1981). The military decorations of the Roman army. London: Batsford. OCLC 1336110716.
