= Chaplet =

Chaplet may refer to:

- Chaplet (headgear), a wreath or garland for the head
- Chaplet (prayer), a string of prayer beads and the associated prayer
- Chaplet (metallurgy), a metal form to hold a core in place

== See also ==
- Wreath (attire)
- Ukrainian wreath
