= Mural crown =

Heraldic crown resembling a wall

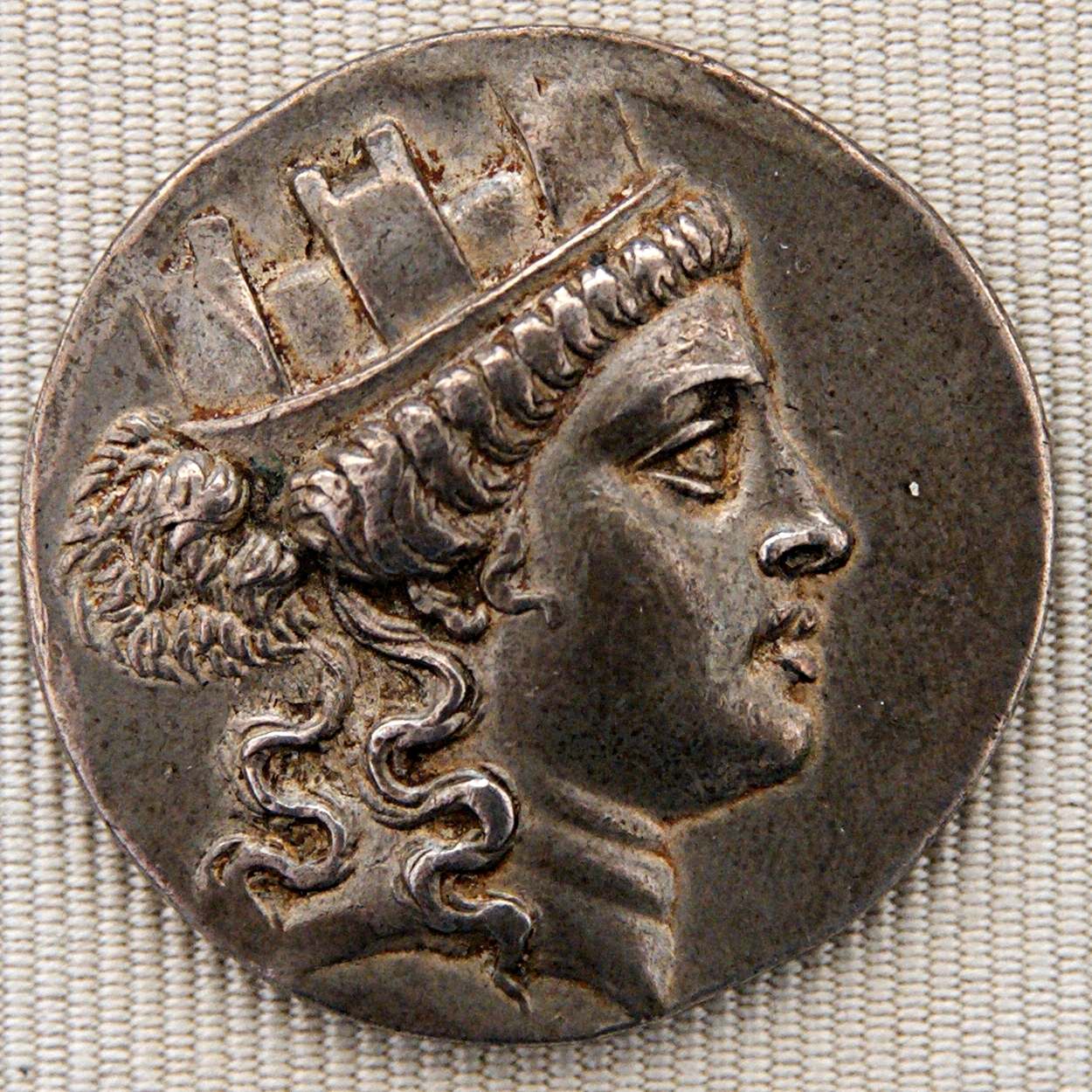
Mural crown on city goddess (on a silver tetradrachm coin issued by Smyrna, 160–150 BC)

A mural crown (Latin: corona muralis) is a crown or headpiece representing city walls, towers, or fortresses. In classical antiquity, it was an emblem of tutelary deities who watched over a city, and among the Romans a military decoration. Later the mural crown developed into a symbol of European heraldry, mostly for cities and towns, and in the 19th and 20th centuries was used in some republican heraldry.

== Usage in ancient times ==
Early appearances of the mural crown occur in the Achaemenid Empire, where they resemble crenelations on Mesopotamian and Persian buildings.

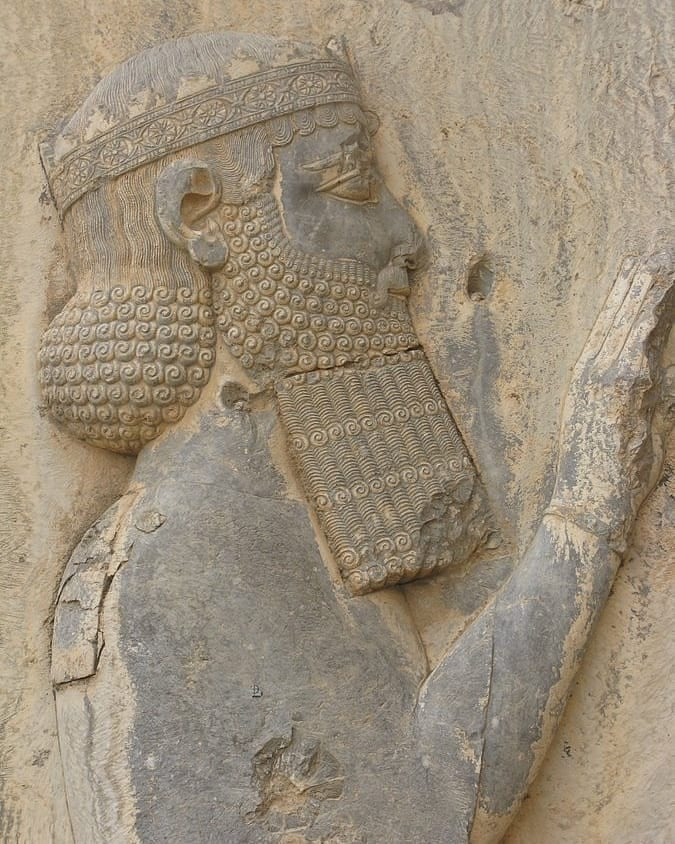
Darius the Great wearing an early mural crown on the Behistun inscription

In Hellenistic culture, a mural crown identified tutelary deities such as the goddess Tyche, the embodiment of the fortunes of a city. The high cylindrical polos of Rhea was rendered as a mural crown for Cybele in Hellenistic times, as patron of a city. The Graeco-Roman goddess Roma's attributes on Greek coinage usually include her mural crown, signifying Rome's status as a loyal protector of Hellenic city-states.

The mural crown became an ancient Roman military decoration. The corona muralis (Latin for "walled crown") was a golden crown, or a circle of gold intended to resemble a battlement, bestowed upon the soldier who first climbed the wall of a besieged city or fortress to successfully place the standard (flag) of the attacking army upon it. The Roman mural crown was made of gold, and decorated with turrets, as is the heraldic version. As it was among the highest order of military decorations, it was not awarded to a claimant until after a strict investigation. The rostrata mural crown, composed of the rostra indicative of captured ships, was assigned as naval prize to the first in a boarding party, similar to the naval crown.

== Heraldic use ==
A heraldic mural crown

The Roman military decoration was subsequently employed in European heraldry, where the term denoted a crown modeled after the walls of a castle, which may be tinctured or (gold), argent (silver), gules (red), or proper (i.e. stone-coloured). In 19th-century Germany, mural crowns (Mauerkronen) came to be adopted for the arms of cities, with increasingly specific details: "Residential (i.e. having a royal residence) cities and capital towns usually bear a Mauerkrone with five towers, large towns one with four towers, smaller towns one with three", observed Arthur Charles Fox-Davies, in A Complete Guide to Heraldry, adding "Strict regulations in the matter do not yet exist" and warning that the usage was not British.

Mural crowns were used, rather than royal crowns, for medieval and modern Italian comuni. A mural-crowned lady, Italia Turrita, personifies Italy. In Italy, comuni and some provinces and military corps have mural crowns on their coats of arms: gold with five towers for cities, and silver with nine-towered for others. The coat of arms of the Second Spanish Republic had a mural crown.

In the early 20th century Portugal established strict rules for its municipal heraldry, in which each coat of arms contains a mural crown, with three silver towers signifying a village or an urban parish, four silver towers representing a town, five silver towers standing for a city and five gold towers for a capital city. The Portuguese rules are also applied to most municipal coats of arms of Brazil and some other members of the Community of Portuguese Language Countries.

Romanian municipal coats of arms contain a mural crown, with one or three towers for villages and communes, five and seven towers for towns and municipalities.

The eagle on the coat of arms of Austria wears a mural crown to signify its status as a republic. This is in contrast to the royal crowns that adorned the double-headed eagle (and the imperial crown positioned above it) in the coat of arms of Austria-Hungary until their defeat in World War I. The mural-crowned eagle was abandoned under the clerico-fascist Federal State of Austria from 1934, but was reinstated in Allied-occupied Austria following World War II and remains in place to this day.

| Mural crowns of French heraldry: 1. Capital 2. Department Capital 3. Commune | Mural crowns of Portuguese heraldry: 1. Village or urban parish 2. Town 3. City 4. Capital | Mural crowns of Romanian heraldry: 1. Village 2. Town 3. City 4. Capital | |
| Mural crowns of Brazil: 1. Village 2. Town 3. City 4. Capital | Modern elaborations of mural crowns of Catalan heraldry | Mural crown of an Italian City | Mural crown of an Italian Comune |

=== Examples from heraldry ===
The coat of arms of Austria

The Coat of Arms of the Austrian State of Lower Austria

Coat of arms of Malta

Coat of arms of the Province of Lleida, Catalonia, Spain

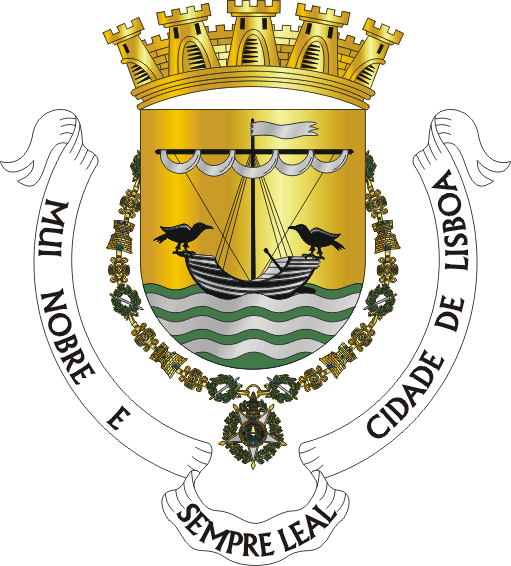
Coat of arms of Lisbon, capital of Portugal

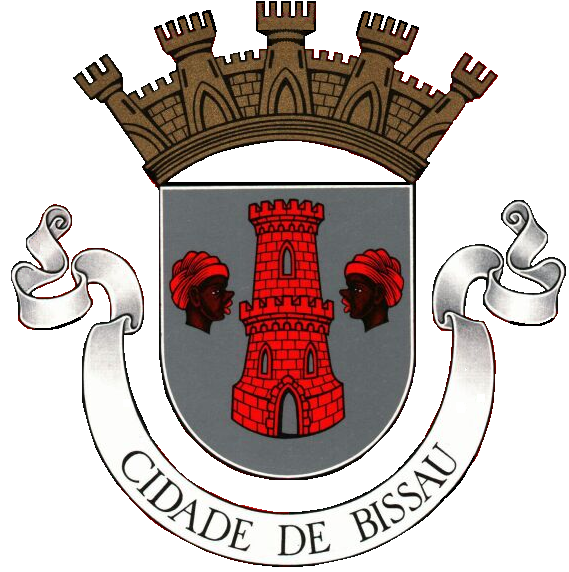
Coat of arms of Bissau, capital of Guinea-Bissau

Coat of arms of Berlin, capital of Germany. Here, the wall of the mural crown is combined with the leaves of the people's crown, marking Berlin's status as both a city and a state.

Coat of arms of Sofia, capital of Bulgaria

The coat of arms of the city of Milan, Italy

The coat of arms of Morterone, the smallest Italian commune

Coat of arms of the city of São Paulo, capital of the State of São Paulo, Brazil

The coat of arms of Trondheim, Norway

The coat of arms of Arad, Romania

The coat of arms of Krasnoyarsk is topped with a form of mural crown, which is the golden five-tower coronet of rank of a Russian federal subject administrative centre.

Coat of Arms of Kryvyi Rih, Ukraine

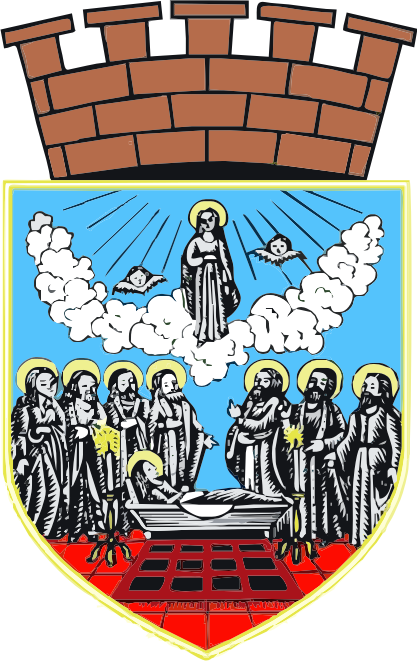
Coat of arms of the City of Zrenjanin, Serbia

Coat of arms of Ninove, Belgium

== See also ==
- Camp crown
- Celestial crown
- Chaplet (headgear)
- Circlet
- Corolla (headgear)
- Naval crown
- Grass crown
- Civic crown
- Civic heraldry
- Crown
- Diadem
- Ferronnière
- Fillet (clothing)
- Laurel wreath
- Liangbatou
- Italia Turrita
- Kokoshnik
- National personification
- Polos
- Olive wreath
- Tainia (costume)
- The Stella d’Italia
- Tiara
- Vinok
- Wreath (attire)
  - Emblem of Italy
