= Coat of arms of Trondheim =

- Adopted: 1897
- Other elements: Mural crown

The coat of arms of Trondheim is based on the medieval seal of the city. The seal is probably from the 13th century, but its earliest preserved form is on a document from 1344. The coat of arms was assumed by the city council in 1897, and has a more intricate design than most other Norwegian coats of arms.

It features to the left (heraldic right) a church portal with an archbishop with a bishop's staff and a mitre, to the right (heraldic left) a castle portal with a king with a crown holding a set of scales. The portals and figures rest on an arch beneath which are three male heads. The king and archbishop symbolises the town's status as the first capital of Norway and as the residence of the archbishop. The set of scales is said to symbolise justice, but may also be seen as an allusion to the delicate balance between the church and the king. The three heads might symbolise the city council. The shield itself is blue and surrounded by a silver mural crown. The original seal also bore the inscription SIGILLVM OMNIVM CIVIVM NIDROSIENSIS CIVITATIS which translates as The seal of the citizens of the city of Nidaros. The design of the shield in its present form was made by Haakon Thorsen.

== Flag ==
Most Norwegian municipalities have a banner of their respective coats of arms as a flag. The flag of Trondheim is instead a red field with the yellow "Trondheim rose".

== Sources ==
- Hans Cappelen and Knut Johannessen: Norske kommunevåpen, Oslo 1987
- Trondheim municipality page on the coat of arms
- Trondheim municipality page on the flag
