= Flag of Trondheim =

Norwegian city flag

Trondheim
- Use: Civil flag
- Proportion: 2:3
- Adopted: 1989
- Design: A red field and a yellow Trondheim rose at center.
- Designed by: Arne E. Holm

The flag of Trondheim is one of the official symbols of the city and municipality of Trondheim in Norway.

Most Norwegian municipalities have a banner of their respective coats of arms as a flag. Trondheim has no modern heraldic coat of arms, but a seal unsuitable as a banner of arms, a yellow "Trondheim rose" on a red field was chosen for the flag of Trondheim. The designer of the flag was professor Arne E. Holm, whose proposal was approved by the municipal council in 1989, and confirmed by royal order the same year.

== Symbolism ==
The four-petal dog rose is the official flower of the city and its stylized form is related to the Tudor rose.

It is found as a symbol in medieval sources among other things representing St. Olav. This flower has been used as a symbol of the city at least since the 16th century. It is earliest preserved in the seal of the church chapter of Trondheim used in the 16th century. In the 17th century, it was used on a green field in the city's citizen guard banner. It has also been used as a symbol of several guilds such as the masons, bakers, goldsmiths and smiths. In the 18th century, the flower replaced the three heads in the seal of Trondheim. The idea of the rose as a symbol of Trondheim may originally have come into being because of a misinterpretation of the last syllable of the city's old name Nidaros.

== Reception ==
The flower has been so closely connected to Trondheim that the Norwegian heraldic authority denied other municipalities the use of it in their coats of arms.

The flag of Trondheim has been highlighted as an example of a good city flag design by Roman Mars in his radio show "99% invisible", a radio show focused on design and architecture.

== See also ==
- Coat of arms of Trondheim

== Sources ==
- Trondheim municipality page on the Trondheim rose
- Trondheim municipality page on the flag
