= Camp crown =

Military award in Ancient Rome

In Ancient Rome, a camp crown (Latin: corona castrensis, "crown of the castrum"), also known as a vallary crown, was a military award given to the first man who penetrated into an enemy camp or field during combat. It took the form of a gold crown surmounted with replicas of the stakes of a palisade (a high fence consisting of pointed stakes).

In the heraldry of a few units in modern armies, a camp crown is mounted as a crest on top of the shield of the coat of arms or emblem.

The Palisado crown, a variant used in English heraldry, is defined by palisades affixed to the outside of the rim.

== Gallery ==
Example of a Camp crown

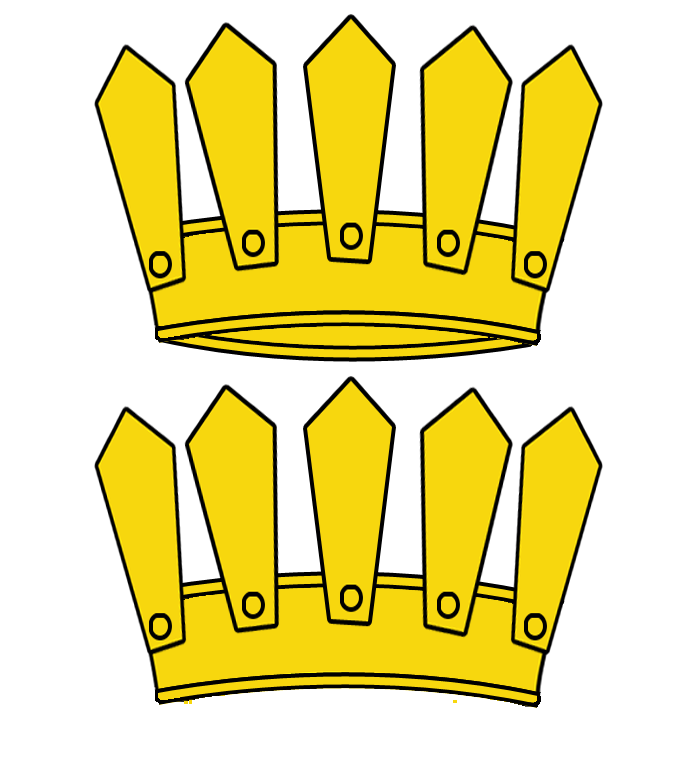
Example of Palisado crowns (English Heraldry)

Emblem of the Course in the History and Aesthetics of Military Music of the Spanish Army

== See also ==
- Celestial crown
- Civic Crown
- Grass crown
- Mural crown
- Naval crown
- Heraldry
- Laurel wreath
