= Marcus Calpurnius Flamma =

Roman military leader

Marcus Calpurnius Flamma was a Roman military leader and hero in the First Punic War.

Flamma was a military tribune who led 300 volunteers on a suicide mission to free a consular army from a defile in which they had been trapped by the Carthaginians. Flamma was found gravely wounded under a pile of bodies but survived.

According to Livy, Consul Aulus Atilius Calatinus "carelessly led his troops to a place where they were surrounded by Carthaginians." Flamma asked for 300 volunteers for a diversionary attack.

Livy writes:

...Calpurnius Flamma, in the first Punic war, when we were young men, spoke to his three hundred volunteers whom he was leading to the capture of a height situated in the very centre of the enemy's position: 'Let us,' he exclaimed, 'die, my men, and by our death rescue our blockaded legions from their peril'....

Frontinus writes:

This man, seeing that the army had entered a valley, the sides and all commanding parts of which the enemy had occupied, asked and received from the consul three hundred soldiers. After exhorting these to save the army by their valour, he hastened to the centre of the valley. To crush him and his followers, the enemy descended from all quarters, but, being held in check in a long and fierce battle, they thus afforded the consul an opportunity to extricate his army.

Pliny the Elder states that he was awarded the Grass Crown.
