= Symbols of Kryvyi Rih =

Symbols of Kryvyi Rih, Ukraine

Coat of arms of Kryvyi Rih

Versions
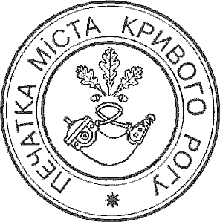
- City Seal
- Armiger: Kryvyi Rih City Council
- Adopted: 20 May 1998
- Crest: silver city crown
- Shield: traditional Iberian

Banner of Kryvyi Rih
- Use: Small vexillological symbol or pictogram in black and white showing the different uses of the flag
- Proportion: 1:1
- Adopted: 20 May 1998
- Design: Kryvyi Rih City Council

The coat of arms of Kryvyi Rih is the official heraldic symbol of Kryvyi Rih. Symbols approved by resolution number 30 in the third session of XXIII convocation on May 20, 1998. The oak leaves symbolize the past, present and future and their inextricable link, and as a living natural form - constant development and renewal. Green stands for prosperity, freedom, hope and joy. Red - courage and knightly virtue, love, courage, generosity. Gold - wealth, power, and faithfulness. Silver - purity of thought and actions.

The banner of Kryvyi Rih is one of the symbols of the city. A square red-green canvas depicts the city coat of arms.

The first coat of arms of the city was adopted by the Zemstvo Assembly in 1912, but was never officially approved. Its reconstruction was published in the collection "Kryvyi Rih in postcards, documents, photographs". The coat of arms of the Soviet era was approved in 1972. The shield is beveled on the right, azure and red. In the first part there is a silver chemical plant, in the second - a silver mine with spoil heaps. The red head is burdened with the name of the city Argent in Ukrainian.

== Images ==
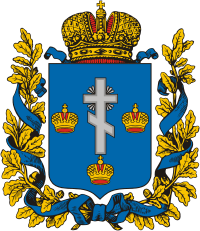
Kherson Governorate coat of arms

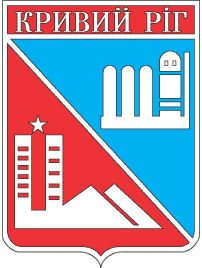
Soviet coat of arms

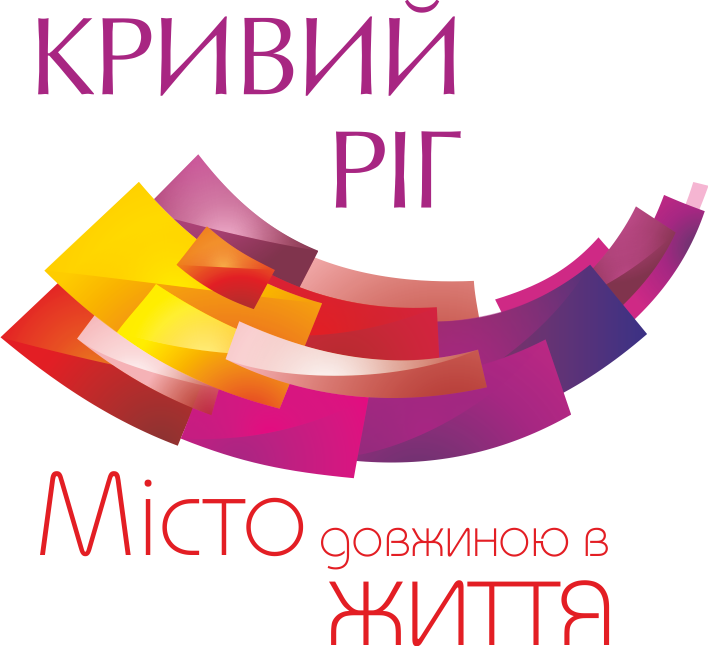
City logo

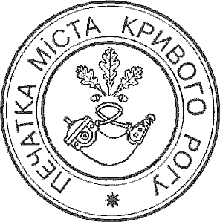
City seal

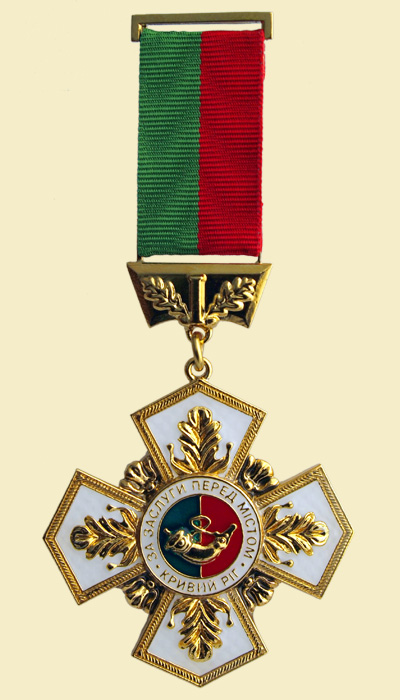
City Order of Merit
