= Grass Crown =

Highest ancient Roman military decoration

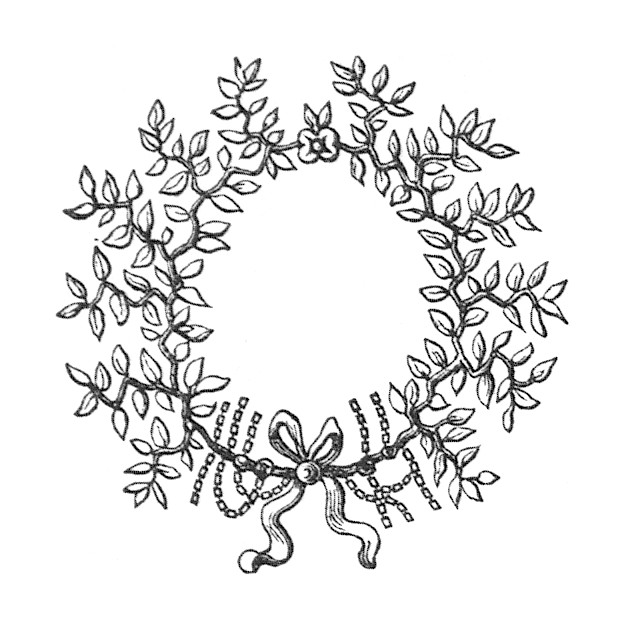
The corona obsidionalis (illustration from Meyers Konversations-Lexikon, 1890)

The Grass Crown (Latin: corona graminea) or Blockade Crown (corona obsidionalis) was the highest and rarest of all military decorations in the Roman Republic and early Roman Empire. It was presented only to a general, commander, or officer whose actions saved a legion or the entire army. One example of actions leading to awarding of a grass crown would be a general who broke the blockade around a beleaguered Roman army. The crown took the form of a chaplet made from plant materials taken from the battlefield, including grasses, flowers, and various cereals such as wheat; it was presented to the general by the army he had saved.

== History ==
Pliny wrote about the grass crown at some length in his Natural History (Naturalis Historia):

...but as for the crown of grass, it was never conferred except at a crisis of extreme desperation, never voted except by the acclamation of the whole army, and never to any one but to him who had been its preserver. Other crowns were awarded by the generals to the soldiers, this alone by the soldiers, and to the general. This crown is known also as the "obsidional crown" [siege crown], from the circumstance of a beleaguered army being delivered, and so preserved from fearful disaster. If we are to regard as a glorious and a hallowed reward the civic crown, presented for preserving the life of a single citizen, and him, perhaps, of the very humblest rank, what, pray, ought to be thought of a whole army being saved, and indebted for its preservation to the valour of a single individual?

Pliny also lists the men who by their deeds won the grass crown:

- Lucius Siccius Dentatus
- Publius Decius Mus (received two grass crowns—one from his own army, and another from the surrounded troops he had rescued)
- Marcus Calpurnius Flamma (during the First Punic War)
- Quintus Fabius Maximus Verrucosus (presented by "the Senate and people" after Hannibal had been expelled from Italy)
- Scipio Aemilianus (in 148 BC in Africa)
- Gnaeus Petreius Atinas (a primus pilus centurion during the Cimbrian War)
- Lucius Cornelius Sulla (during the Social War at Nola, according to his own memoirs)
- Augustus (the crown was presented by the Roman Senate as a political homage rather than a military award)

== See also ==
- Camp crown
- Mural crown
- Civic crown
- Naval crown
- Laurel wreath
- Chaplet (headgear)
