= Civic Crown =

Second-highest ancient Roman military decoration

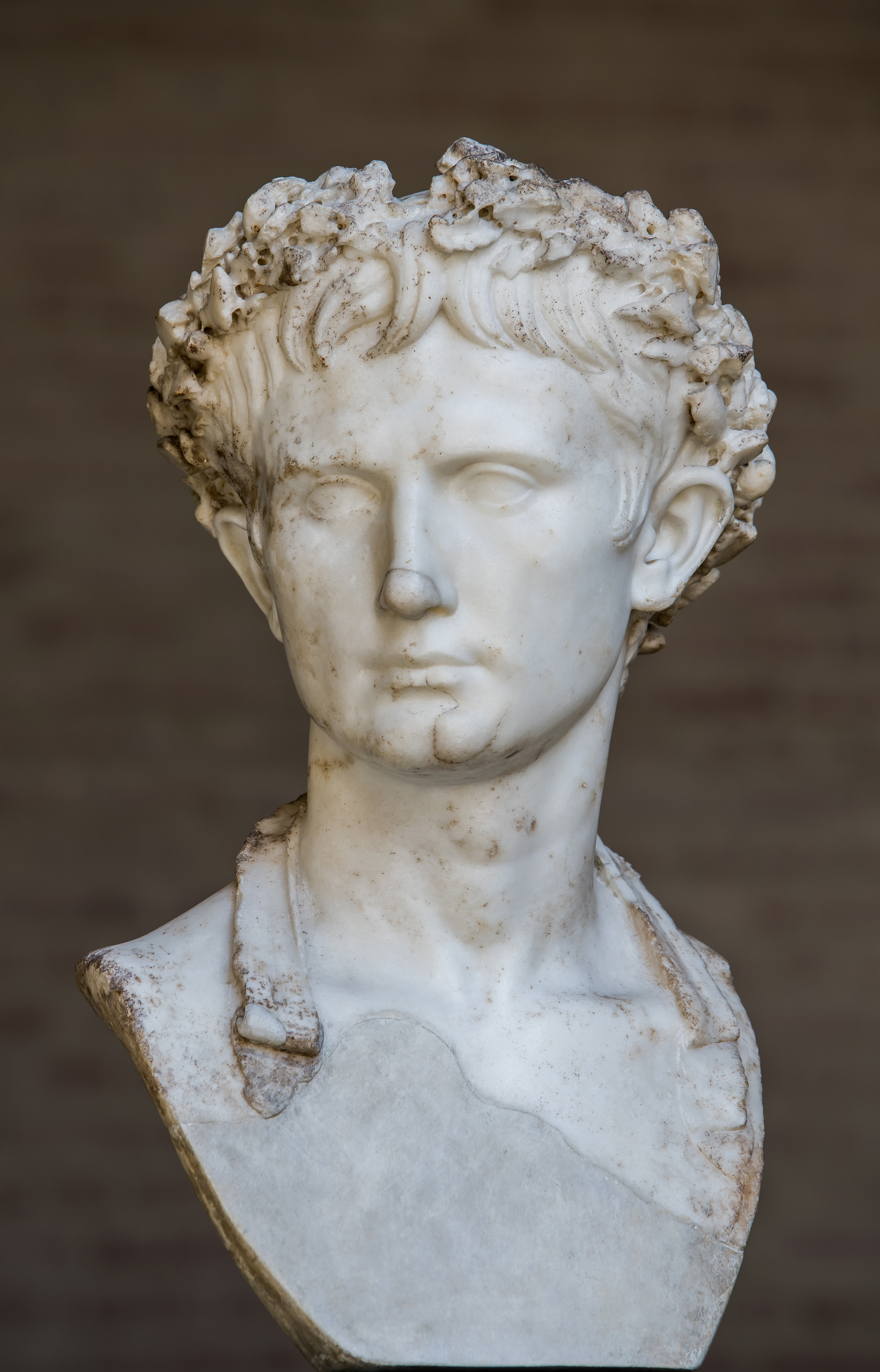
Augustus wearing the oak-leaf Civic Crown, (Glyptothek, Munich)

The Civic Crown (Latin: corona civica) was a military decoration during the Roman Republic and the subsequent Roman Empire, given to Romans who saved the lives of fellow citizens. It was regarded as the second highest decoration to which a citizen could aspire (the Grass Crown being held in higher regard). It took the form of a chaplet of common oak leaves woven to form a crown. It was reserved for Roman citizens who saved the lives of fellow citizens by slaying an enemy during battle. The citizen saved must admit it; no one else could be a witness.

== History ==
After Sulla's constitutional reforms, any recipient of the Civic Crown was entitled entry into the Roman Senate. Furthermore, the recipient was required by law to wear his crown at every public gathering, and was applauded even by men much senior to himself. It later became a prerogative for Roman emperors to be awarded the Civic Crown (originating with Augustus, who was awarded it for saving the lives of citizens by ending the series of civil wars).

Pliny wrote about the Civic Crown at some length in Naturalis Historia:

Nor is the same honour any greater if the rescued person is a general, because the founders of this institution wished the honour to be supreme in the case of any citizen. The receiver of the wreath may wear it for the rest of his life; when he appears at the games it is the custom for even the senate always to rise at his entrance, and he has the right to sit next to the senators; and he himself and his father and his paternal grandfather are exempt from all public duties. Siccius Dentatus, as we have mentioned at the proper place, won fourteen Civic Wreaths, and Capitolinus six, one in his case being actually for saving the life of his commanding officer Servilius. Scipio Africanus refused to accept a wreath for rescuing his father at the Trebbia. How worthy of eternity is a national character that rewarded exploits so distinguished with honour only, and whereas it enhanced the value of its other wreaths with gold, refused to allow the rescue of a citizen to be a thing of price, thus loudly proclaiming that it is wrong even to save the life of a human being for the sake of gain!

Julius Caesar was awarded the Civic Crown for his service in the Siege of Mytilene in 81 BC.

== Gallery ==
Coat of arms of Peru

Coat of arms of the First Spanish Republic. Civic Crown version

Coat of arms of Basque Country, Spain

== See also ==
- Laurel wreath
- Camp crown
- Mural crown
- Naval crown
- Diadem
