= Laurel wreath =

Wreath made of branches and leaves of the bay laurel

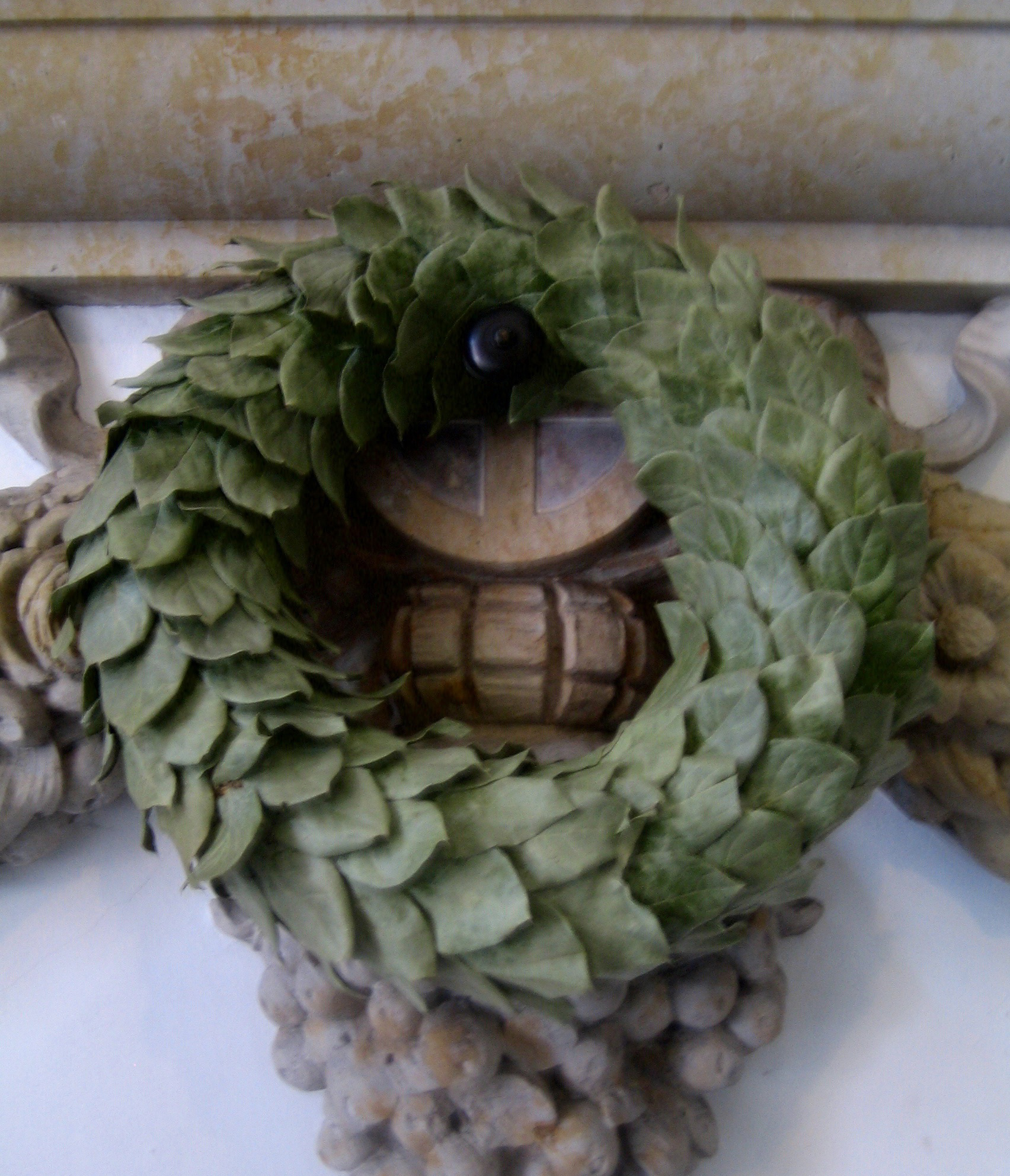
A laurel wreath decorating a memorial at the Folketing, the national parliament of Denmark.

A laurel wreath is a symbol of triumph, a wreath made of connected branches and leaves of the bay laurel (Laurus nobilis), an aromatic broadleaf evergreen. It was also later made from spineless butcher's broom (Ruscus hypoglossum) or cherry laurel (Prunus laurocerasus). It is worn as a chaplet around the head, or as a garland around the neck.

Wreaths and crowns in antiquity, including the laurel wreath, trace back to Ancient Greece. In Greek mythology, the god Apollo, who is patron of lyrical poetry, musical performance (Note: Specifically, Apollo was the patron of musical performance on the kithara, a professional, heavy-body member of the lyre family; the lyre itself was a folk-instrument. When so-engaged himself, he was called Apollo Citharoedus, roughly "Apollo the musician". Wind instruments were normally in the purview of other deities, such as Pan.) and skill-based athletics, is conventionally depicted wearing a laurel wreath on his head in all three roles. Wreaths were awarded to victors in athletic competitions, including the ancient Olympics; for victors in athletics they were made of wild olive tree known as "kotinos" (κότινος), (sc. at Olympia) – and the same for winners of musical and poetic competitions. In Rome they were symbols of martial victory, crowning a successful commander during his triumph. Whereas ancient laurel wreaths are most often depicted as a horseshoe shape, modern versions are usually complete rings.

In common modern idiomatic usage, a laurel wreath or "crown" refers to a victory. The expression "resting on one's laurels" refers to someone relying entirely on long-past successes for continued fame or recognition, whereas to "look to one's laurels" means to be careful of losing rank to competition.

== Background ==
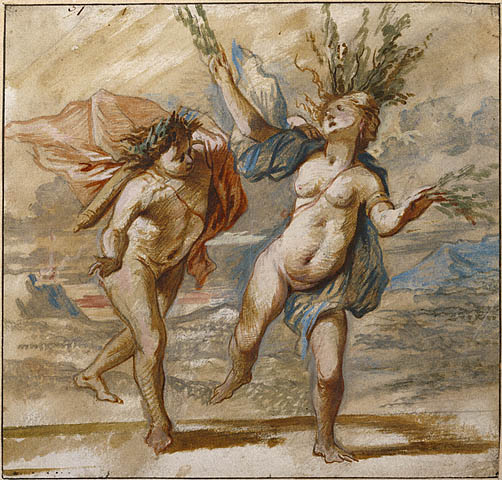
Apollo and Daphne

Apollo, the patron of sport, is associated with the wearing of a laurel wreath. This association arose from the ancient Greek mythology story of Apollo and Daphne. Apollo mocked the god of love, Eros (Cupid), for his use of bow and arrow, since Apollo is also patron of archery. The insulted Eros then prepared two arrows—one of gold and one of lead. He shot Apollo with the gold arrow, instilling in the god a passionate love for the river nymph Daphne. He shot Daphne with the lead arrow, instilling in her a hatred of Apollo. Apollo pursued Daphne until she begged to be free of him and was turned into a laurel tree.

Apollo vowed to honor Daphne forever and used his powers of eternal youth and immortality to render the laurel tree evergreen. Apollo then crafted himself a wreath out of the laurel branches and turned Daphne into a cultural symbol for him and other poets and musicians.

== Academic use ==
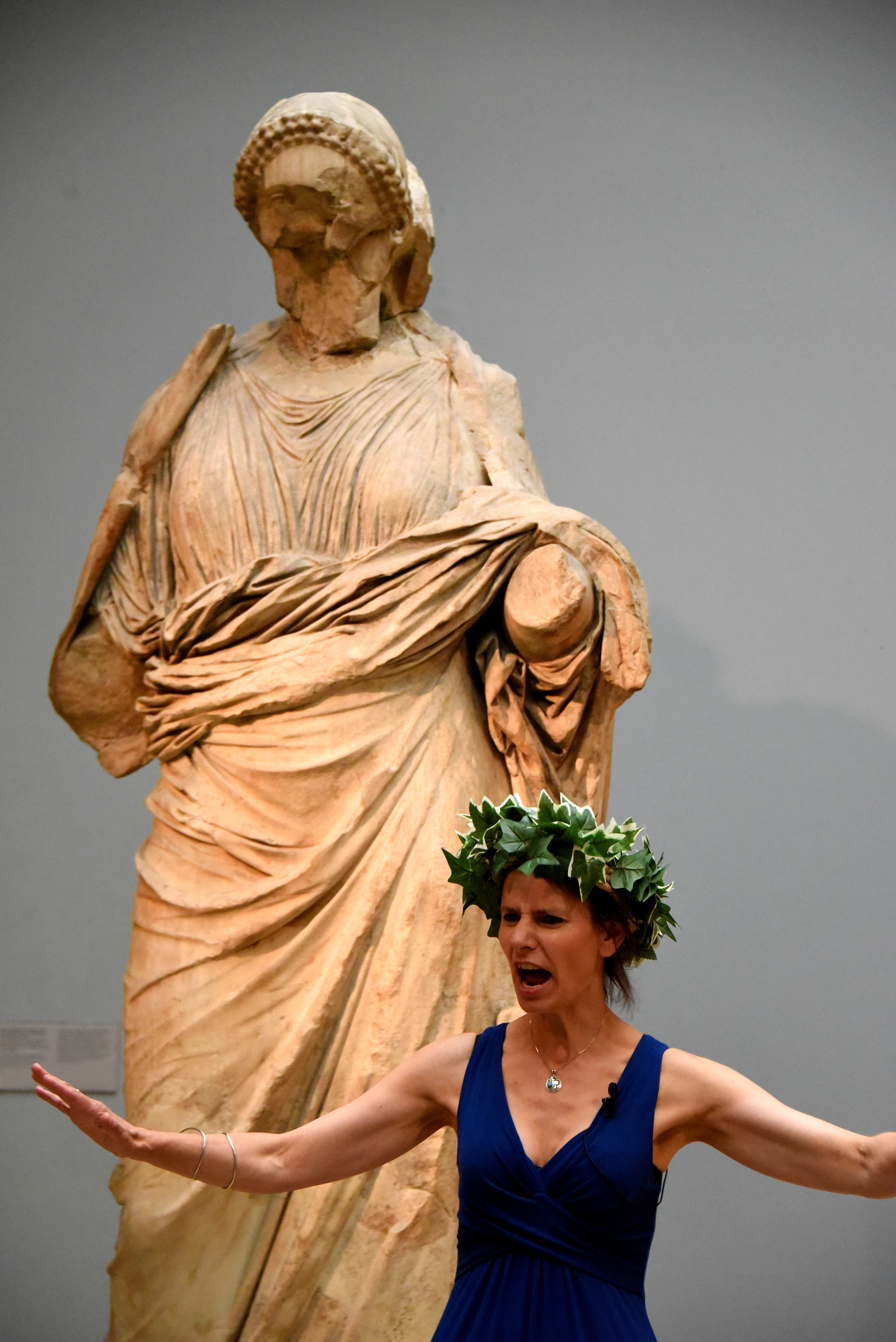
An actress performing a play. She wears an ivy wreath and stands in front of a statue of a woman from the Mausoleum at Halicarnassus (room 21, The British Museum, London)

In some countries, the laurel wreath is used as a symbol of the master's degree. The wreath is given to young masters at the university graduation ceremony. The word "laureate" in 'poet laureate' refers to the laurel wreath. For example, the greatly admired medieval Florentine poet and philosopher Dante Alighieri is often represented in paintings and sculpture wearing a laurel wreath.

In Italy, the term laureato is used in academia to refer to any student who has graduated. Right after the graduation ceremony, or laurea in Italian, the student receives a laurel wreath to wear for the rest of the day. This tradition originated at the University of Padua and has spread in the last two centuries to all Italian universities.

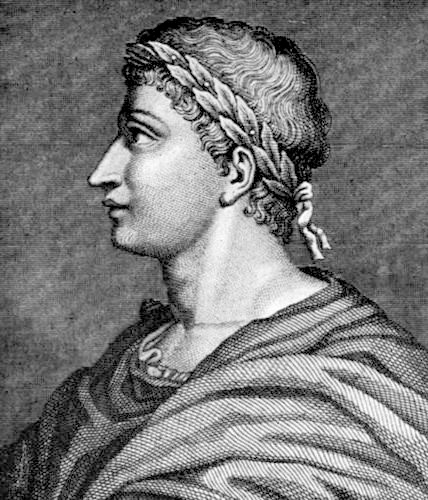
Ovid with laurel wreath, common in poets

At Connecticut College in the United States, members of the junior class carry a laurel chain, which the seniors pass through during commencement. It represents nature and the continuation of life from year to year. Immediately following commencement, the junior girls write out with the laurels their class year, symbolizing they have officially become seniors and the period will repeat itself the following spring.

At Mount Holyoke College in South Hadley, Massachusetts, USA, laurel has been a fixture of commencement traditions since 1900, when graduating students carried or wore laurel wreaths. In 1902, the chain of mountain laurel was introduced; since then, tradition has been for seniors to parade around the campus, carrying and linked by the chain. The mountain laurel represents the bay laurel used by the Romans in wreaths and crowns of honor.

At Reed College in Portland, Oregon, United States, members of the senior class receive laurel wreaths upon submitting their senior thesis in May. The tradition stems from the use of laurel wreaths in athletic competitions; the seniors have "crossed the finish line", so to speak.

At St. Mark's School in Southborough, Massachusetts, students who successfully complete three years of one classical language and two of the other earn the distinction of the Classics Diploma and the honor of wearing a laurel wreath on Prize Day.

In Sweden, those receiving a doctorate or an honorary doctorate in subjects traditionally falling within the Faculty of Philosophy (meaning philosophy, languages, arts, history and social sciences, as well as the natural sciences), receive a laurel wreath during the ceremony of conferral of the degree.

In Finland, in University of Helsinki a laurel wreath is given during the ceremony of conferral for master's degree.

== Architectural and decorative arts motif ==
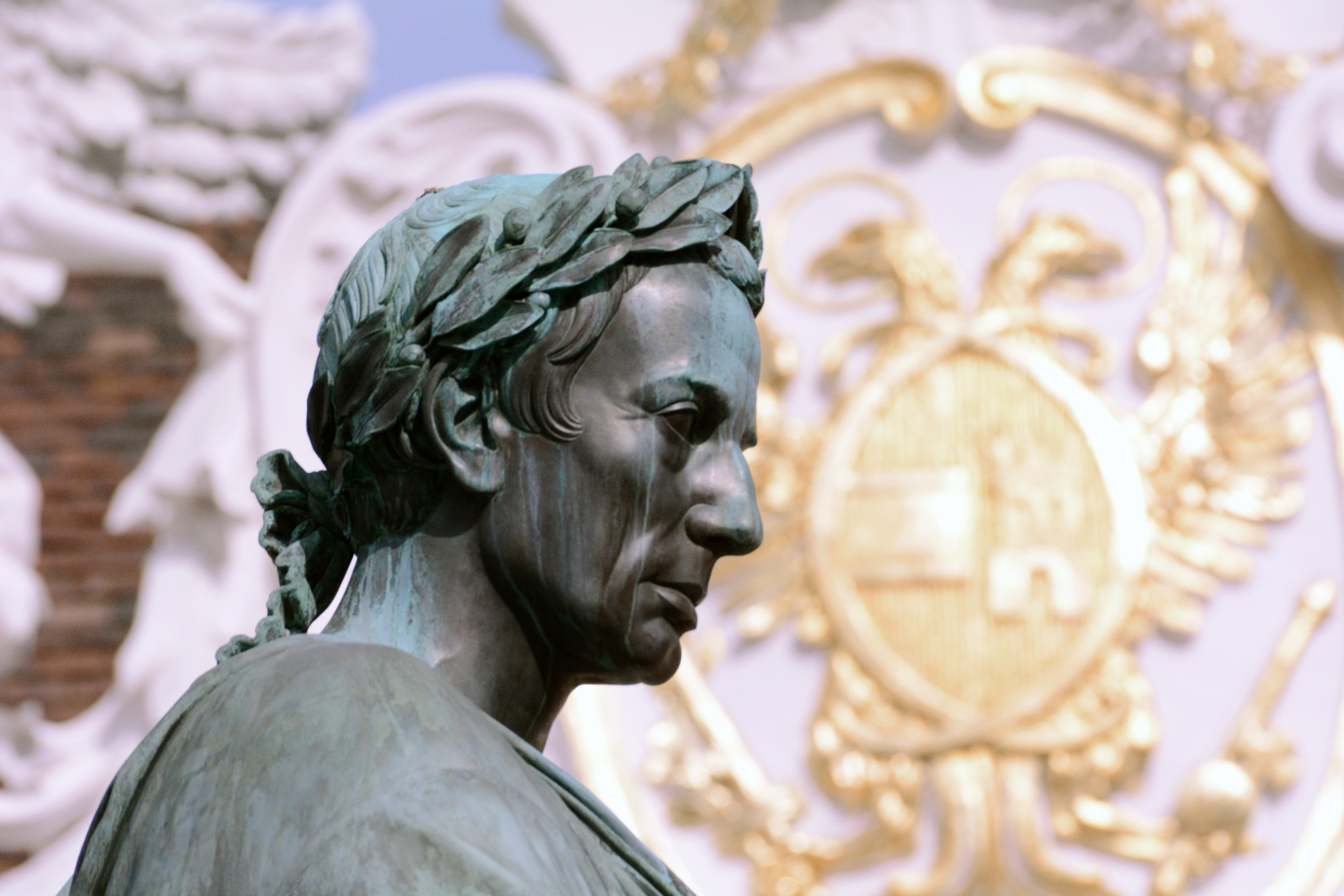
Bronze monument to Francis II, the last Holy Roman emperor, wearing a corona triumphalis laurel wreath

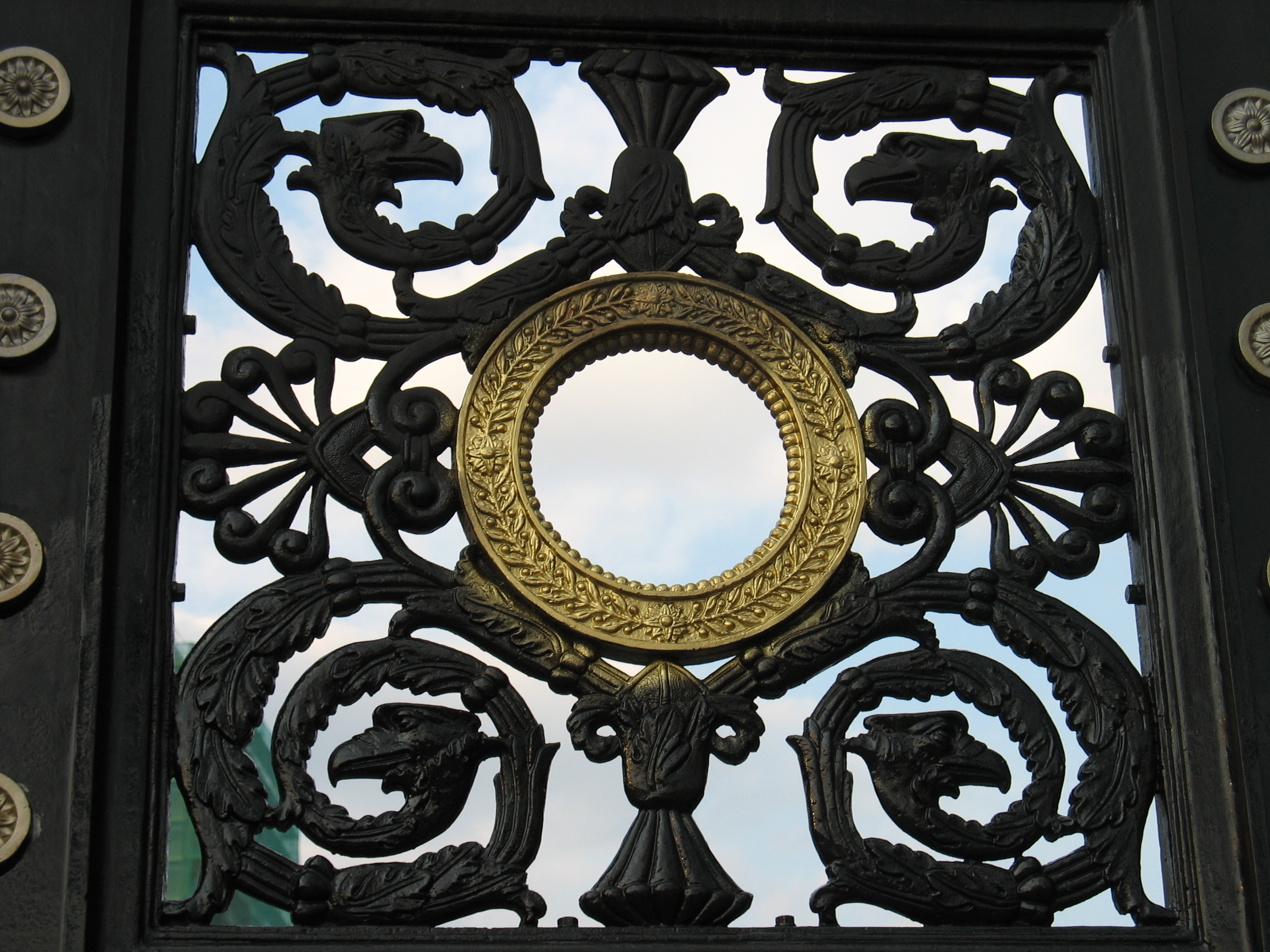
Alexander Garden Grille

The laurel wreath is a common motif in architecture, furniture, and textiles. The laurel wreath is seen carved in the stone and decorative plaster works of Robert Adam, and in Federal, Regency, Directoire, and Beaux-Arts periods of architecture. In decorative arts, especially during the Empire period, the laurel wreath is seen woven in textiles, inlaid in marquetry, and applied to furniture in the form of gilded brass mounts.

Alfa Romeo added a laurel wreath to their logo after they won the inaugural Automobile World Championship in 1925 with the P2 racing car.

== As used in heraldry ==
A laurel wreath in the emblem of the Spanish anarcho-syndicalist labor union, the CNT.

Media related to Laurel wreaths in heraldry at Wikimedia Commons

Laurel wreaths are commonly used in heraldry. They may be used as a charge in the shield, around the shield, or on top of it. Wreaths are a form of headgear akin to circlets.

In heraldry, a twisted band of cloth holds a mantling onto a helmet. This type of charge is called a "torse". A wreath is a circlet of foliage, usually with leaves, but sometimes with flowers. Wreaths may also be made from oak leaves, flowers, holly and rosemary; and are different from chaplets. While usually annular, they may also be penannular like a brooch.

In the Society for Creative Anachronism, laurel wreaths are reserved for use in the arms of a territorial branch, which are required to include one or more.

== Film publicity ==
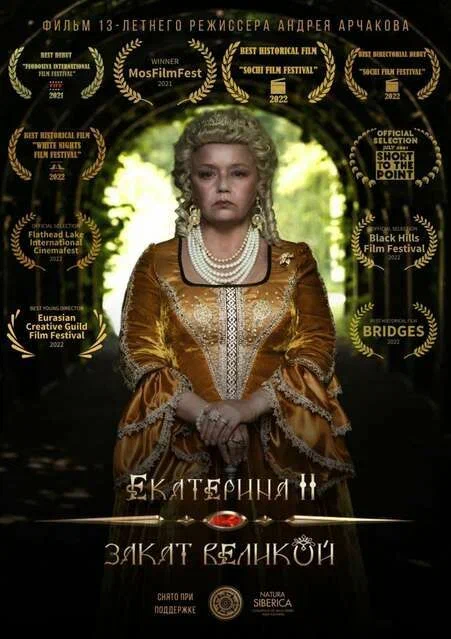
Example of film festival laurels on a film poster

Laurel wreaths are used by motion pictures to indicate recognition by film festivals.

Prestigious film festivals often receive thousands of submissions with only a handful of slots available for as low as a 1% acceptance rate at top tier festivals, while smaller festivals will have better odds at around 10%. Film buyers, distributors, and critics know that film festival programmers are hired for their taste and ability to curate a program that its audiences trust, and for a film to be selected to show at those festivals can validate a relatively unknown filmmaker as one they believe is worth watching.

Independent films without recognizable actors or studio films seeking art house credibility will advertise the selection and screening by festivals by placing laurels with the recognition given by the festival on their key art, however the predominance of festivals means that there are also unscrupulous festivals with high submission fees and guaranteed rewards that offer desperate filmmakers the ability to claim selection by said festival.

Veteran filmmakers know that even if they are already well known, the recognition of a prestigious festival for a premiere will often serve to provide valuable earned media to drive viewers to the box office.

== Wreath of service ==
Wreath of Service

The "wreath of service" is located on all commissioner position patches in the Boy Scouts of America. This is a symbol for the service rendered to units and the continued partnership between volunteers and professional Scouter. The wreath of service represents commitment to program and unit service.

== See also ==
- Civic Crown
- Corolla (headgear)
- Grass Crown
- Kether
- Klila
- Laureate
- Mural crown
- Naval crown
- Nobel laureate
- Olive wreath
- Polos
- Coat of arms of Greece
- Crown of Immortality
- Five crowns
- Halo
- Velificatio
- Wreaths and crowns in antiquity
