= Wreath (attire) =

Headdress made of leaves, grasses, flowers or branches

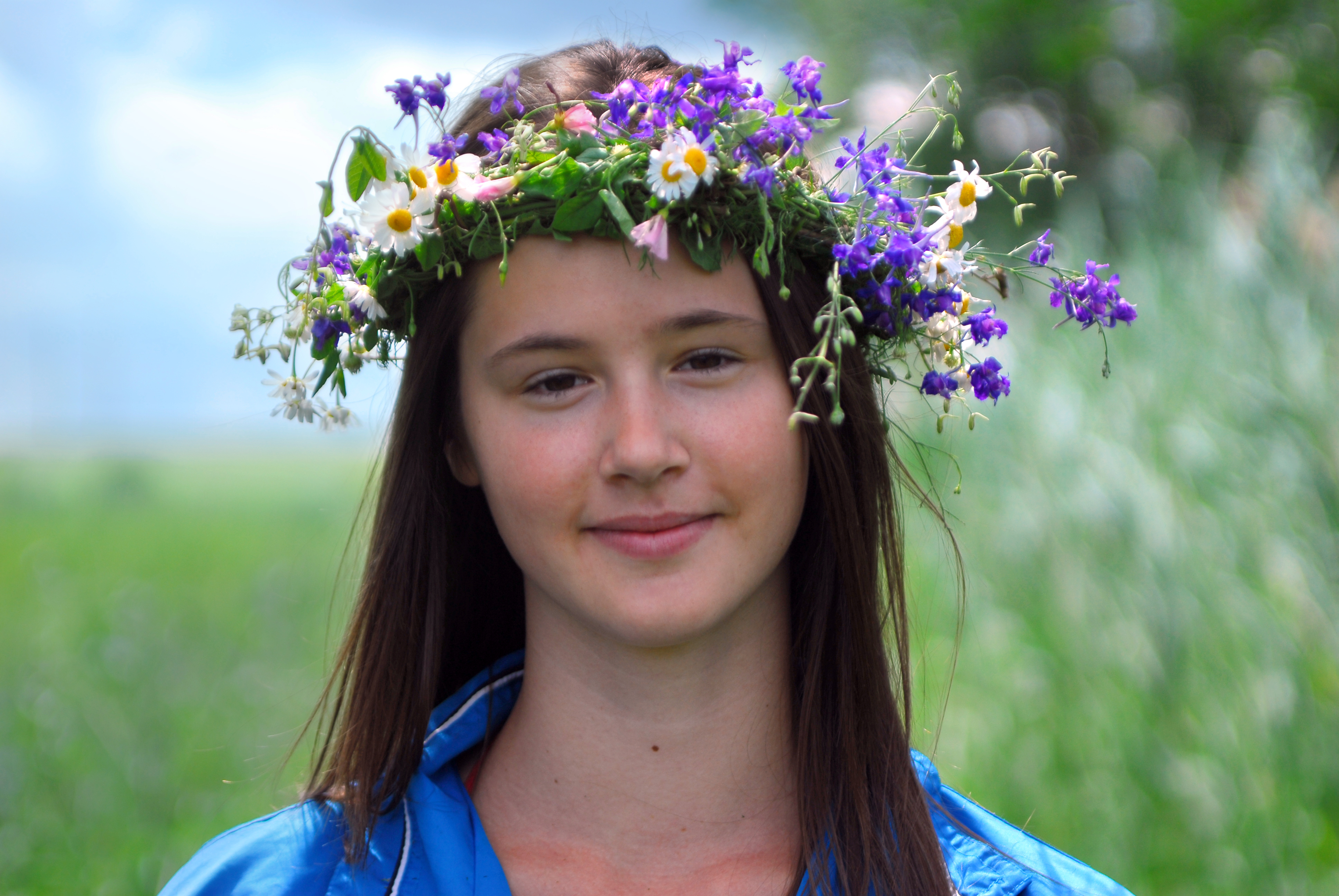
A young girl wearing a floral wreath

A wreath worn for purpose of attire (in English, a "chaplet"; Ancient Greek: στέφανος, romanized: stéphanos, Latin: corona), is a headdress or headband made of leaves, grasses, flowers or branches. It is typically worn on celebrations, festive occasions and holy days, having a long history and association with ancient pageants and ceremonies. Outside occasional use, the wreath can also be used as a crown or a mark of honour. The wreath most often has an annular geometric construction.

== History ==
=== Ancient Greece ===
The wreath has been associated with Greek attire and celebrations since ancient times, a tradition that continues to modern Olympic ceremonies. Ancient coinage minted by early Greek city-states often depicted a divinity or other figure with a wreath. Wearing a wreath may have also had a mediating role by helping the wearer get closer to a specific deity. Different plants were dedicated to various gods: oak to Zeus, laurel to Apollo, herbs to Demeter, grapevine to Dionysos and myrtle to Aphrodite. Wreaths were also used to decorate the hermae, stone pillars surmounted with the head of a god or distinguished mortal.

=== Ancient Rome ===
Wreaths were also part of clothing in Ancient Rome.

Laurel wreaths from the bay laurel tree Laurus nobilis were worn by triumphatores – victorious generals celebrating a Roman triumph. Generals awarded a celebration ritual, the ovation (Latin: ovatio) wore wreaths of myrtle (Myrtus communis).

Wreaths (Latin: coronae, lit. 'crowns') were awarded as military awards and decorations. In the Roman Republic, the nature of the feat determined the nature of the wreath awarded. It was a custom for soldiers rescued from a siege to present a wreath made of grass (Latin: corona graminea or corona obsidionalis) to the commander of the relieving force. This award was extremely rare, and Pliny the Elder enumerated only eight times occasions that had warranted the honour, ending with the emperor Augustus. The oak leaf civic crown (Latin: corona civica) was awarded to Romans who had saved the life of another citizen in battle. The award was open to soldiers in the Roman army of all ranks, unlike most other wreaths, which were awarded to commanders and officers only in the Roman imperial period of the Roman Empire.

A gold wreath (Latin: corona aurea) was also awarded for gallant military conduct. In the Roman navy, the naval crown (Latin: corona navalis, corona classica, or corona rostrata) was a wreath awarded for feats in naval battles. In an assault on a fortified position, a mural crown (Latin: corona muralis) was awarded to the first man onto the walls of the enemy fortification.

=== Christianity ===
In Christianity, the wreath represents the resurrection of Christ and, therefore, eternal life, or more appropriately, the victory of life over death. The crown of thorns was placed on the head of Jesus at his execution by crucifixion and became a symbol of the Passion.

=== Slavic people ===
A tradition of the wreath, a headdress made of leaves, flowers and branches worn by girls and young unmarried women, dates back to the old Slavic customs that predate the Christianization of Rus. The flower wreath remains a part of the Ukrainian national costume and is worn on festive occasions and holy days.

=== Polynesia ===
Floral wreaths and garlands, known as lei (Hawaii), are ubiquitous in Polynesia as both ornamental attire and gifts representative of affection or respect. They are worn by men and women around the neck or around the head and are commonly fashioned of flowers, leaves, vines, and plant fibre.

=== Indigenous peoples of the Americas ===
Wreaths are part of the culture and legends of indigenous peoples of the Americas. The Cheyenne people wear wreaths during sacred ceremonies, rituals, dances and songs and head wreaths are usually made from willow, cottonwood or sage.

=== Modern times ===
Wreaths have resurged in popularity in the 21st century. Flower crowns, or "crowns of love", are popular at outdoor music festivals such as Coachella. Variants made with artificial flowers can be purchased. Flower crowns became a popular internet meme in 2013, originating from the One Direction fandom and consisting of digitally adding the "crown" to celebrities and characters, such as Hannibal Lecter, Sherlock Holmes, and The Doctor.

== Gallery ==
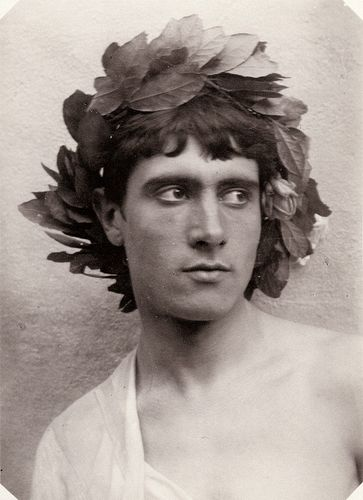
Portrait of boy with Sicilian laurel wreath by Wilhelm von Gloeden, c. 1900

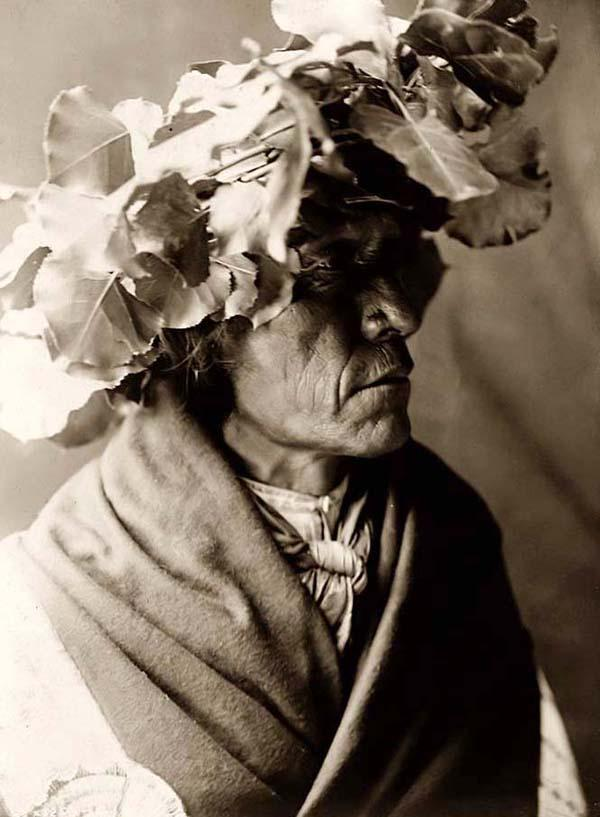
Porcupine, a Cheyenne man, wearing a wreath of cottonwood leaves, 1910

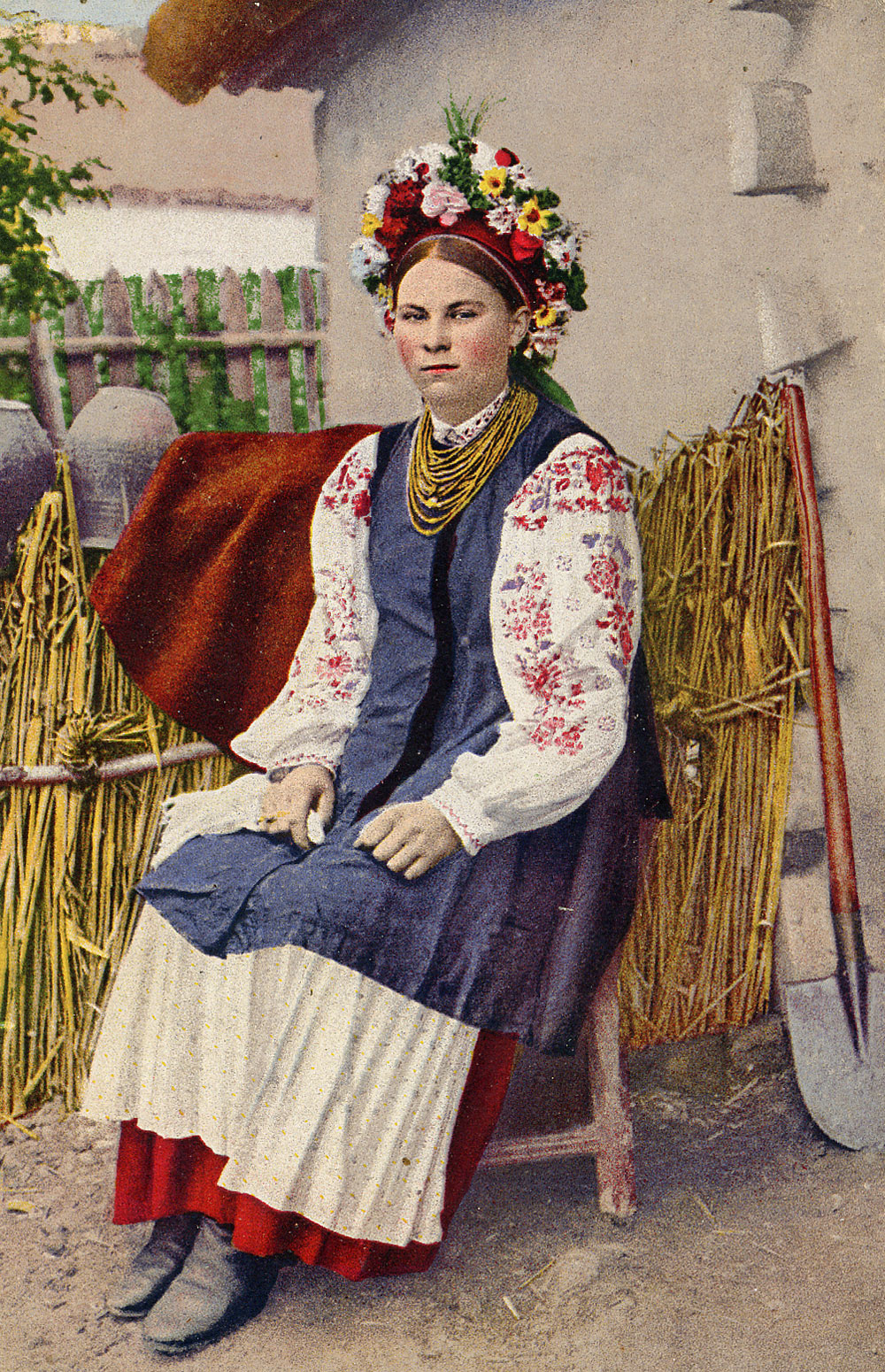
1916 postcard from Kiev, Ukraine (then in the Russian Empire) depicting a kvitkakh (Ukrainian wreath)

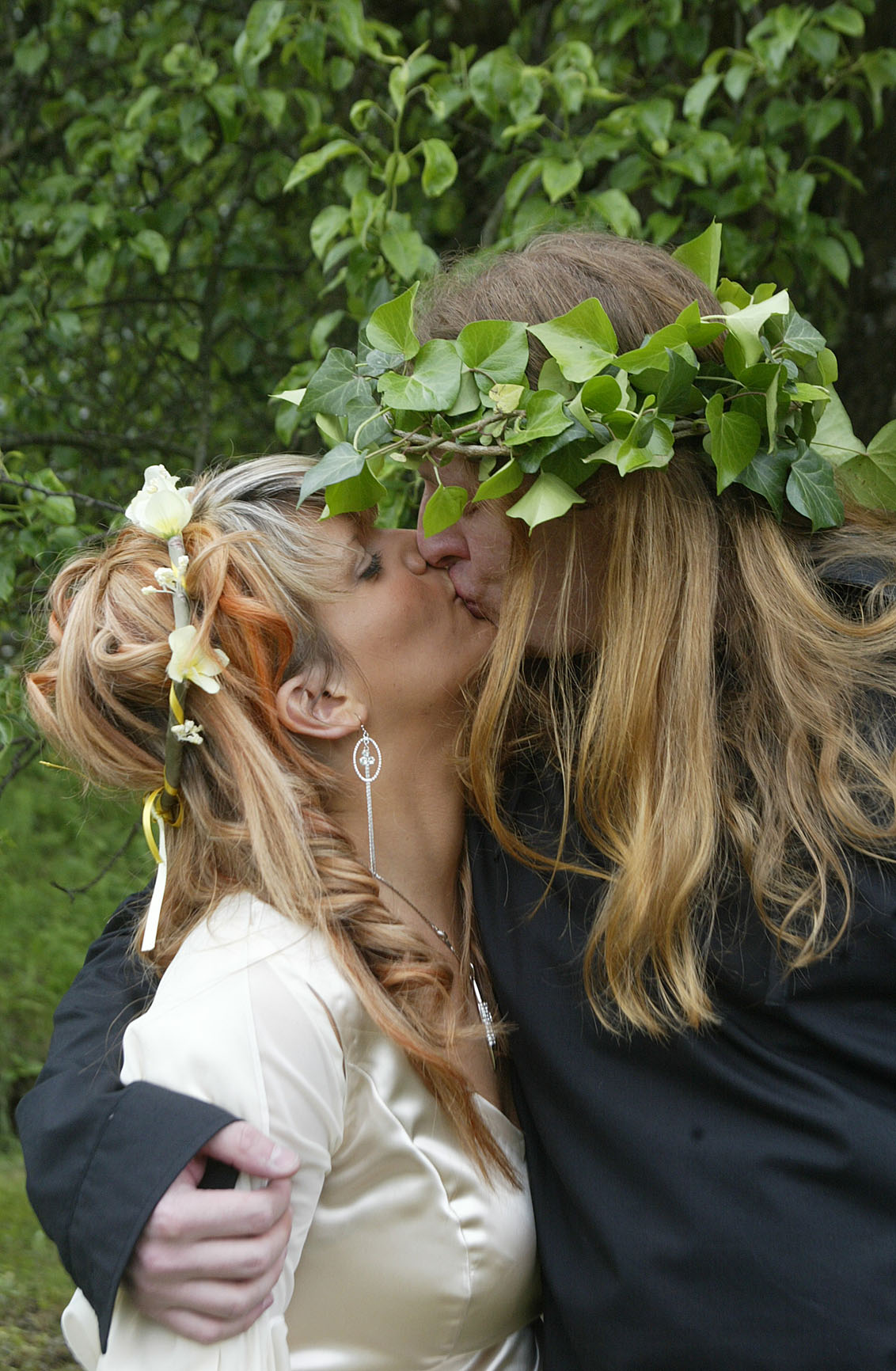
Wiccan wedding wreaths, c. 2009

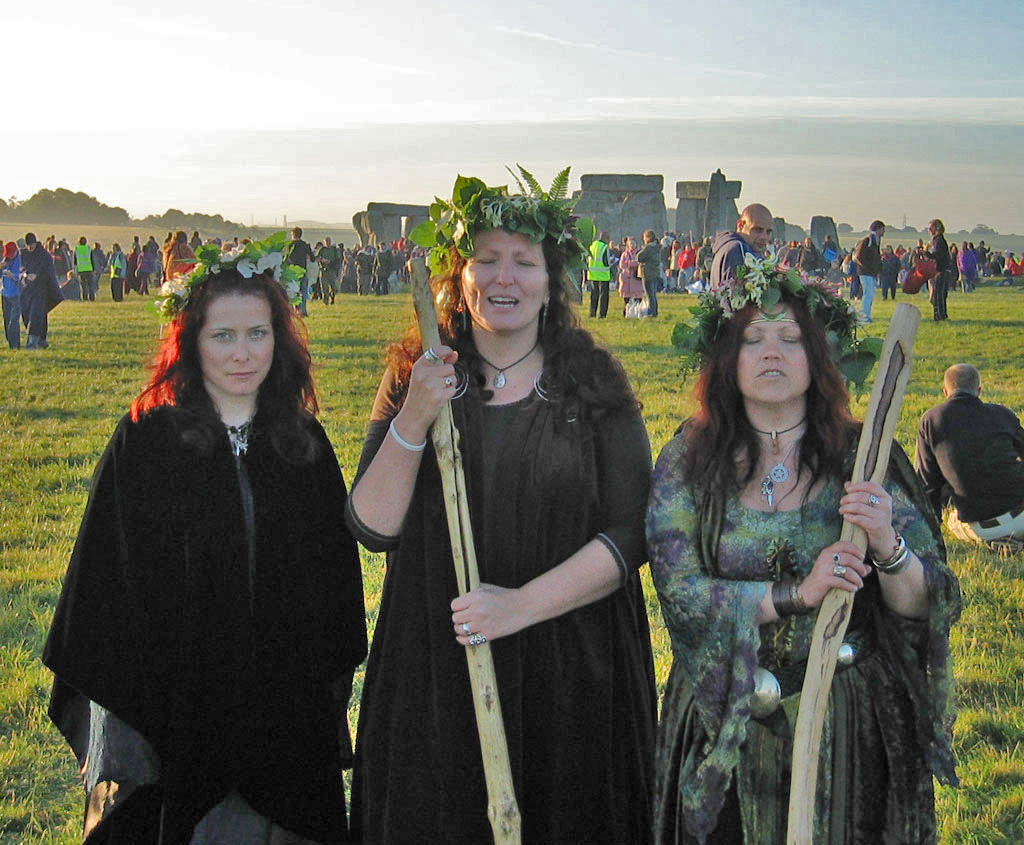
Druid wreaths at Stonehenge summer solstice, 2009

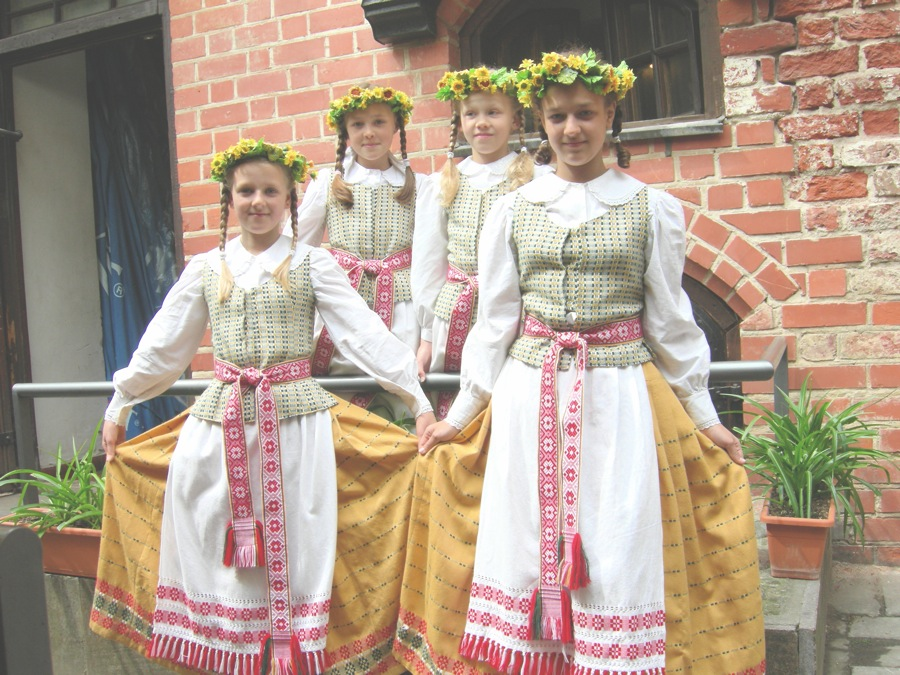
Traditional Lithuanian dress including a wreath, 2009

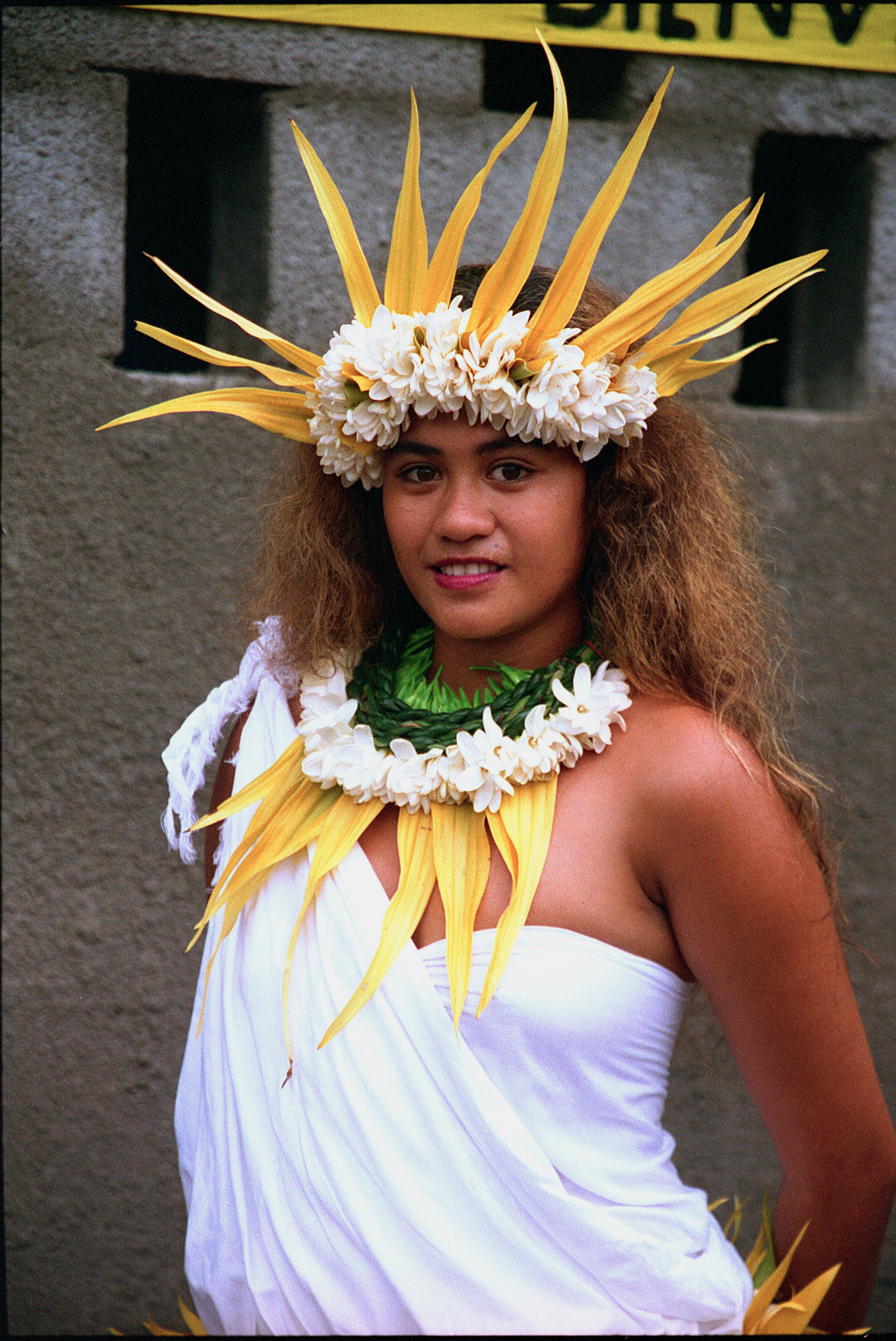
Wreath of Marquesas, 1996

== See also ==
- Diadem
- Garland
- Tainia
