= Ukrainian wreath =

Traditional Ukrainian headress worn by young and unmarried women

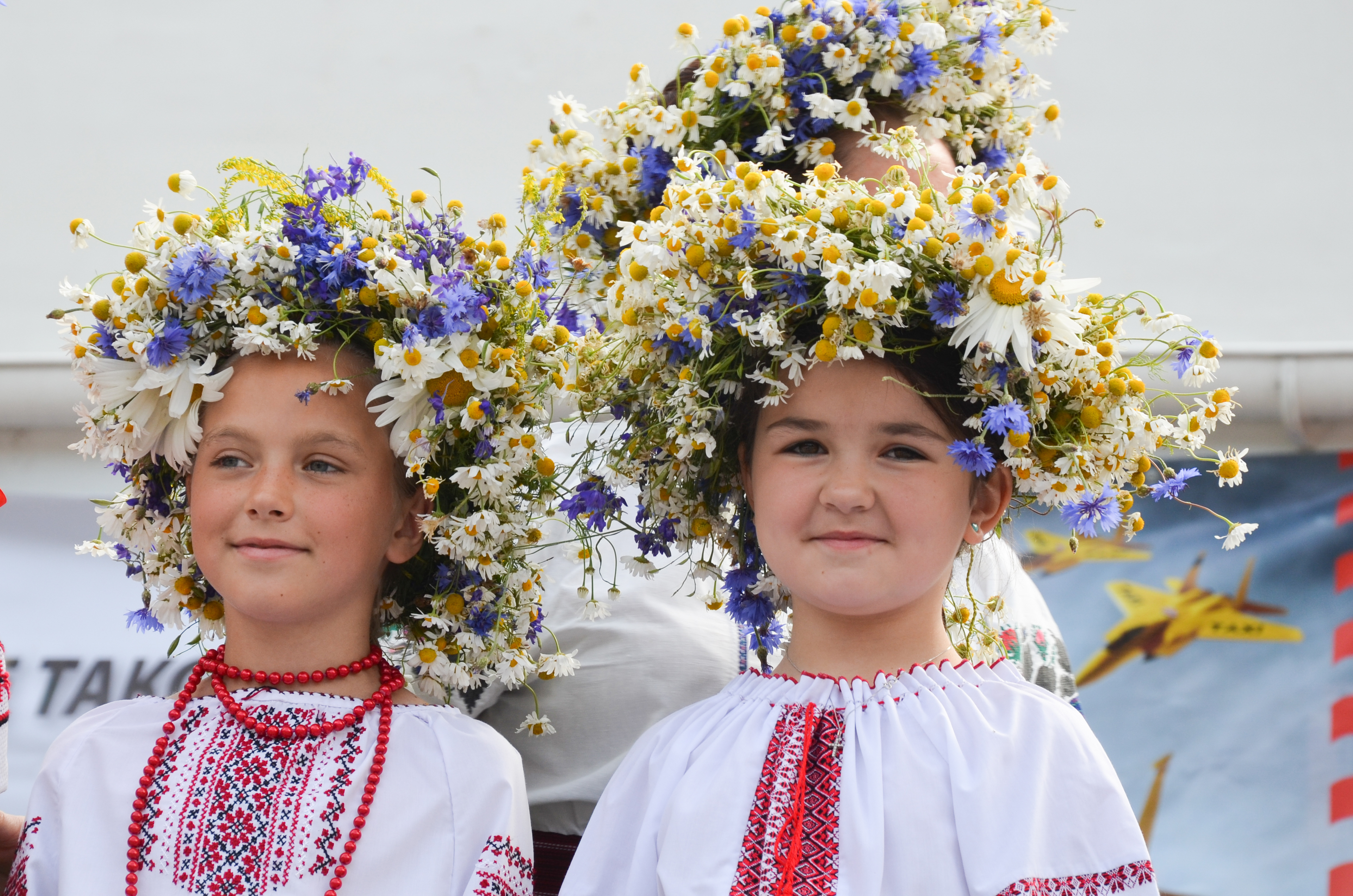
Two girls wearing traditional wreaths during Kupala Night celebrations.

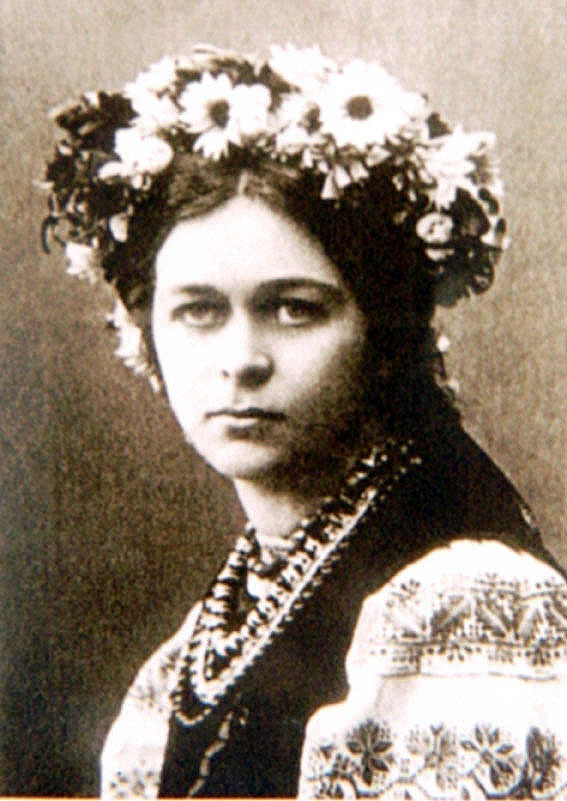
Izydora Kosach-Borysova, 1899

The Ukrainian wreath (Ukrainian: вінок, romanized: vinok, pronounced [ʋʲiˈnɔk]) is a type of wreath which, in traditional Ukrainian culture, is worn by girls and young unmarried women. The wreath may be part of a tradition dating back to East Slavic customs that predate the Christianization of Kievan Rus'. The flower wreath remains a part of the Ukrainian national attire, and is worn on festive occasions and on holy days, and since the 2014 Ukrainian revolution increasingly in daily life as part of a wider cultural revival.

== History ==
=== Vinok Kupala ===
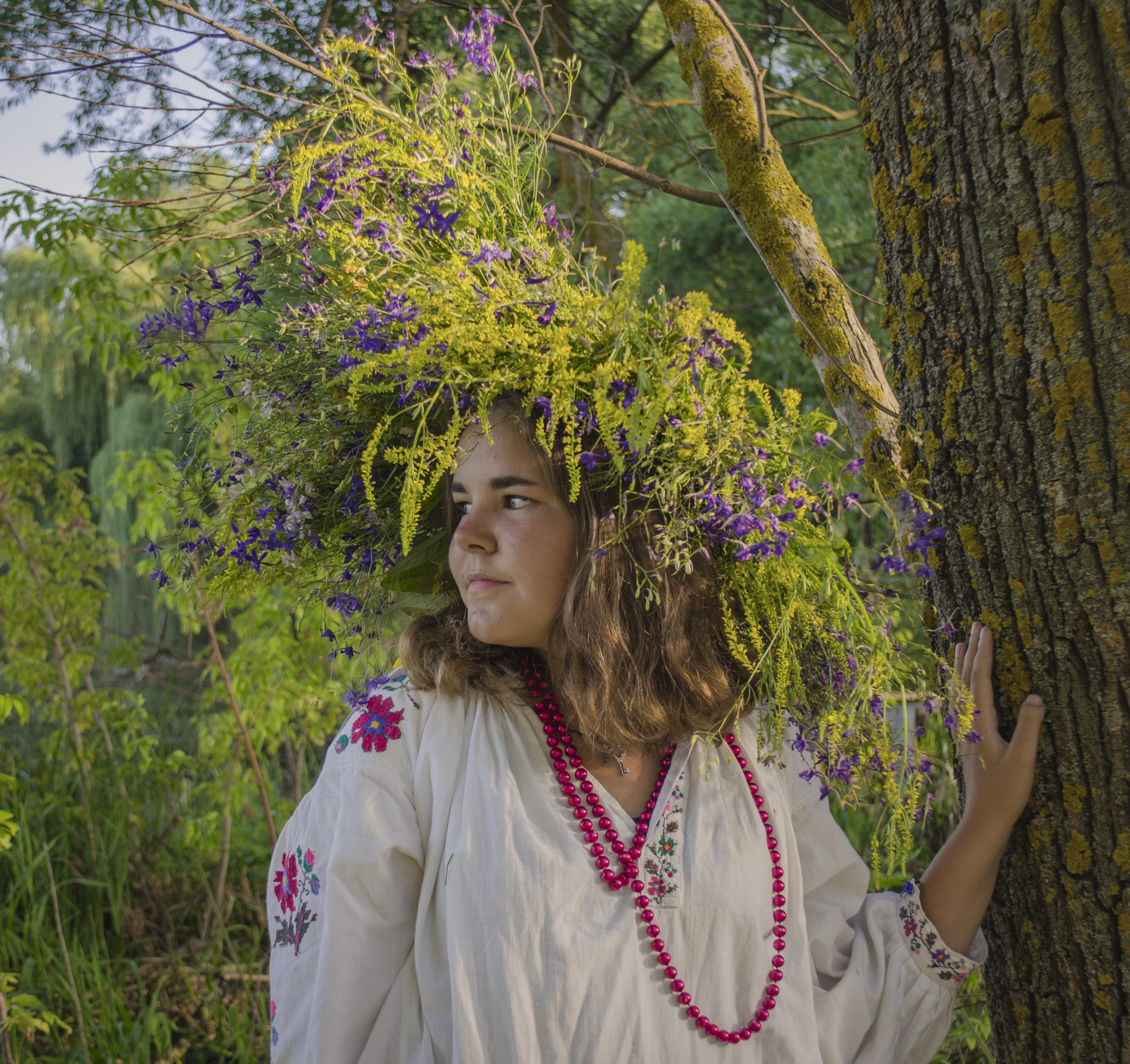
Kupala Night wreath

On the day of Ivana Kupala, young women placed their wreaths in the water with a lighted candle, foretelling their romantic future by how the wreath flowed down the river or lake. From the wreath's direction, the girl could tell whom she would marry: if the wreath stayed in one spot and did not float down the water, she would not marry; if it went under, she would die; if the candle went out, misfortune would follow. The young men would dive into the water, trying to retrieve the vinok of the girl each loved. One of the ritual Kupala songs says, "Who will catch the wreath will catch the girl, who will get the wreath will become mine." It dates back to pre-Christian times when it was thought that the headdress would protect girls from evil spirits. The ceremonial, religious value diminished, and was later replaced as a national character of girlhood: to lose a wreath in folk songs and traditions means for a maiden to transition into womanhood.

In his book The Golden Bough, mythology scholar James George Frazer first claimed that Ivan Kupala Day (John the Baptist Day), celebrated in Ukraine shortly after the summer solstice, and closely associated with the wreath in Ukraine, was in fact originally a pagan fertility rite.

== Appearance and construction ==
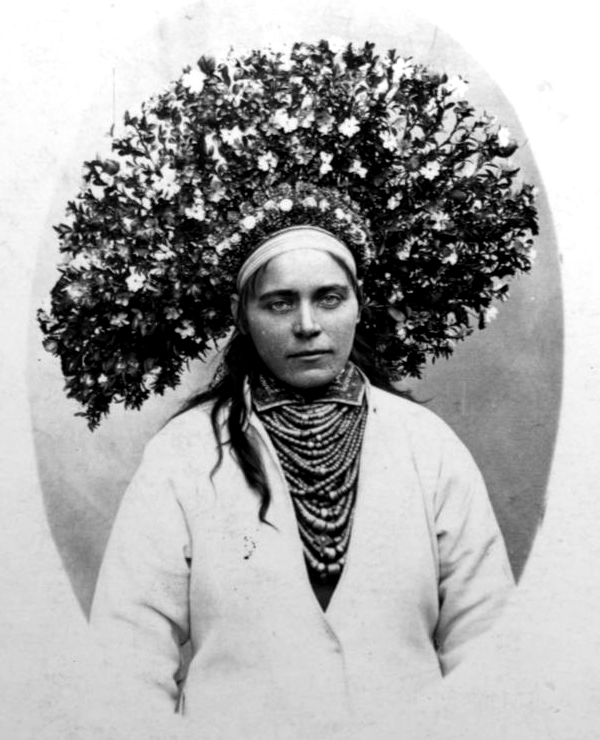
Girl wearing a wedding Ukrainian wreath

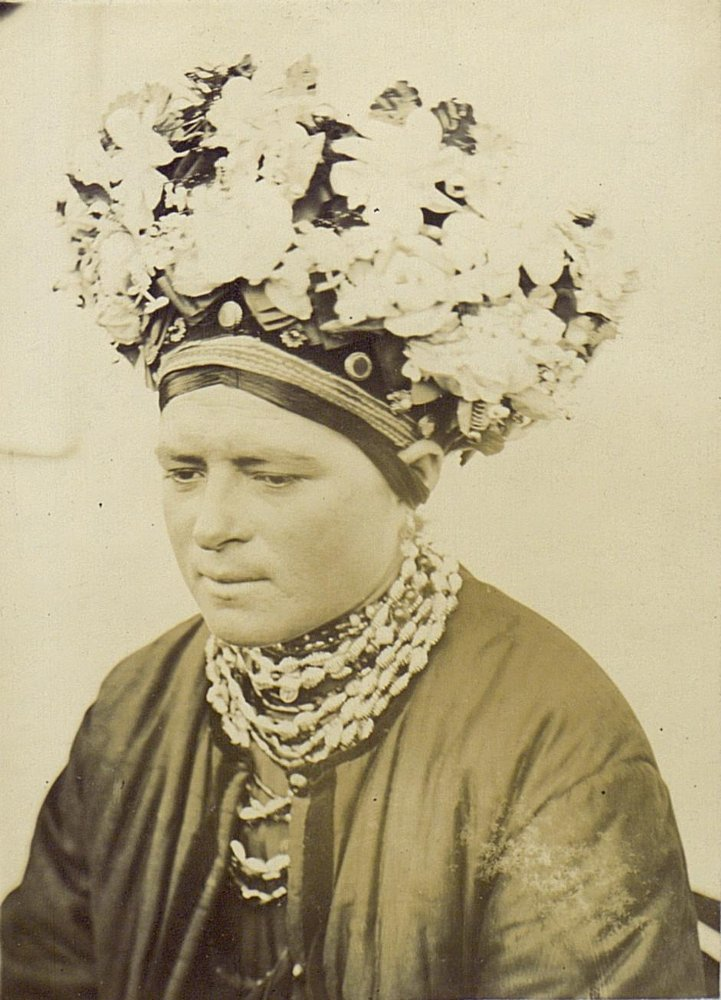
Bride from Kherson region, 1894

Like most Ukrainian folk dress, the vinok had significant symbolic value and only specific flowers were used. It was traditionally worn by girls who were eligible for marriage. The wreath's name, vinok, is related to the Ukrainian word for a wedding ceremony vinchannya. The flowers used to make the wreath were generally fresh, paper or waxen and were attached onto a band of stiff paper backing covered with a ribbon.

The wreath varied in many of the regions of Ukraine; young women throughout the country wore various headdresses of yarn, ribbon, coins, feathers, and grasses, but these all had the same symbolic meaning. In parts of central and eastern Ukraine the flowers were raised in the center front. Usually multicolored, embroidered ribbons were attached to the back. During the Ukrainian wedding ceremony, the vinok was replaced by the ochipok, a cap that she would wear for the rest of her life.

== Contemporary use ==
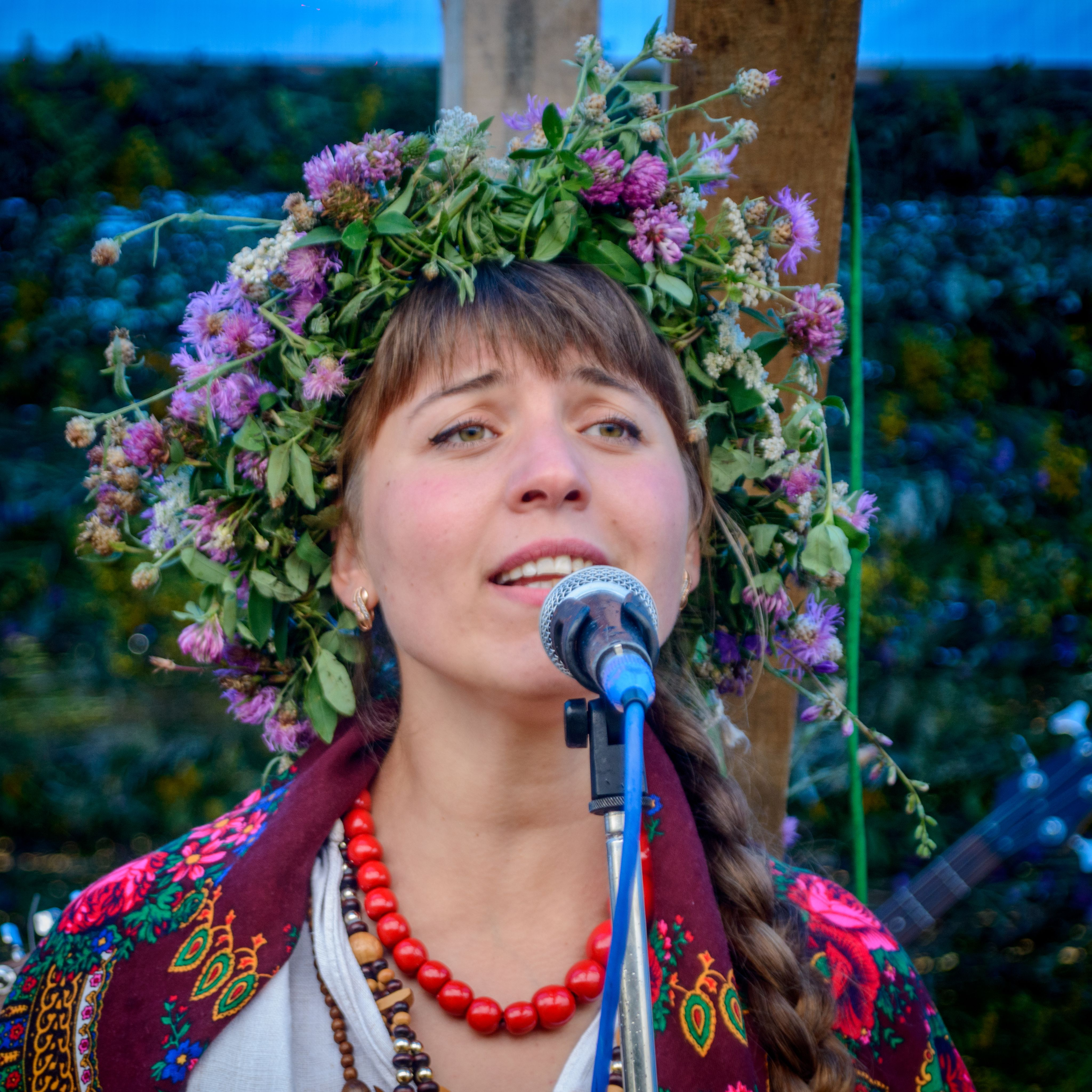
Poltava region

=== Neopaganism ===
Followers of the modern Slavic Neopaganism attach a mystical significance to the wreath, weaving their wreaths of oak leaves and field flowers for their celebration of the Summer Solstice.

=== Cultural revival ===
Since the 2014 Euromaidan uprisings, the wearing of a vinok increased in popularity as part of a wider revival in Ukrainian culturalism and interest in symbols of national pride. In addition to aesthetic purposes, wearing a vinok was also a symbol of protest used in demonstrations beginning in the 2004 Orange Revolution and continuing in the 2014 revolution as well as 2022 demonstrations against the Russian invasion of Ukraine.

== Gallery ==
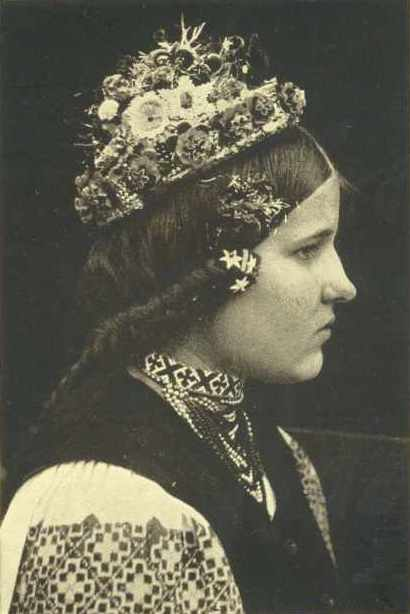
Volovets, с. 1990s

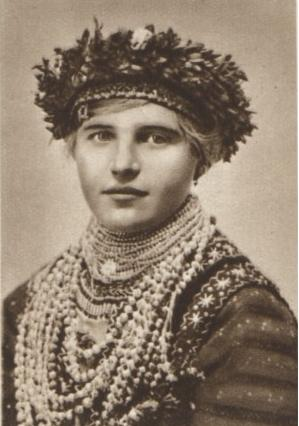
Podillya, 1930

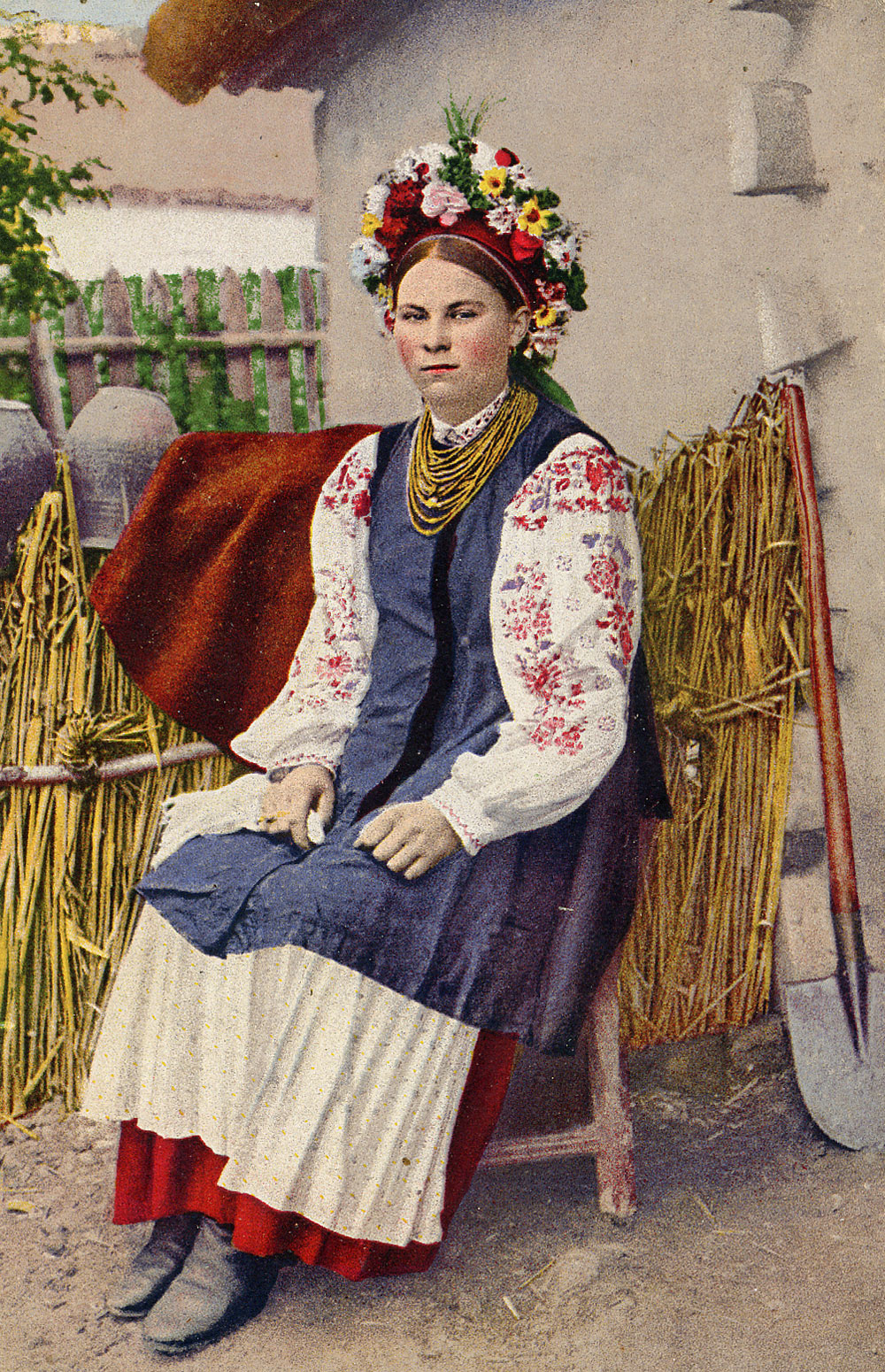
Vyshyvanka and vinok, 1916

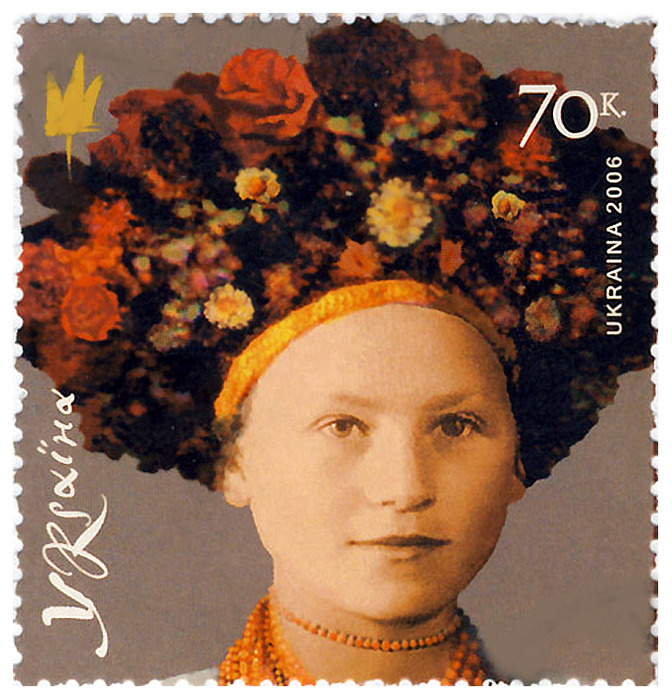
Stamp of Ukraine

== See also ==
- Chaplet (headgear)
