= Naval crown =

Award and heraldic crown made up of the sails and sterns of ships

The Naval Crown (Latin: corona navalis) was a gold crown surmounted with small replicas of the prows of ships. It was a Roman military award, given to the first man who boarded an enemy ship during a naval engagement.

In heraldry a naval crown is mounted atop the shields of coats of arms of the naval vessels and other units belonging to some navies. It is made up of a circlet with the sails and sterns of ships alternating on top.

== Gallery ==
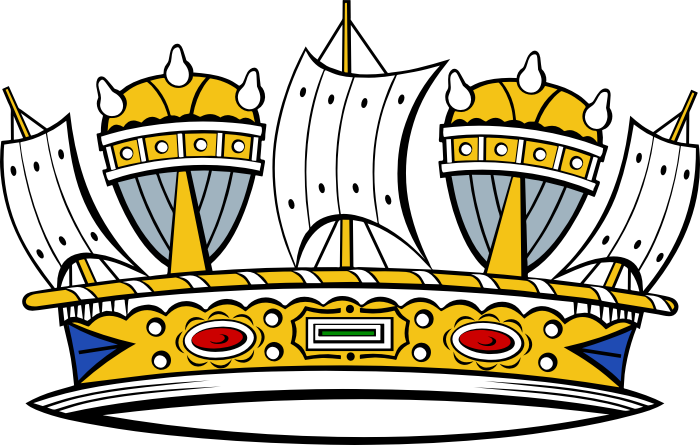
Example of a Naval Crown

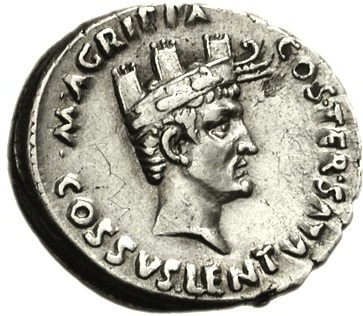
Agrippa wearing the Naval crown, commemorating his role in the Battle of Actium.

A naval crown in the coat of arms of the Brazilian Navy

A naval crown in the coat of arms of the British Indian Ocean Territory

A naval crown in the coat of arms of the Chilean Navy

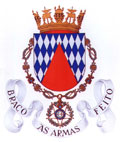
A naval crown in the coat of arms of the Portuguese Marine Corps

A naval crown in the coat of arms of the city of Burgas, Bulgaria

A naval crown in the coat of arms of the Italian Navy

== See also ==
- Astral crown
- Camp crown
- Celestial crown
- Civic crown
- Grass crown
- Mural crown
- Naval heraldry
- Laurel wreath
