= Chaplet (headgear) =

Type of headdress

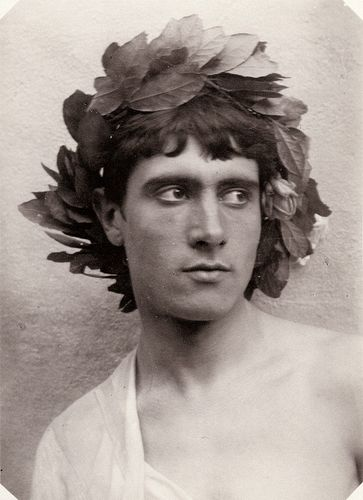
Boy with a chaplet of laurel.

A chaplet is a headdress in the form of a wreath made of leaves, flowers or twigs woven into a ring. It is typically worn on festive occasions and on holy days. In ancient times a chaplet also served as a crown representing victory or authority.

== History ==
In ancient times, chaplets made from branches and twigs of trees were worn by victors in sacred contests; these were known as pancarpiae. Later, flowers were used to "heighten the effect" with their color and smell. Glycera, a flower weaver, challenged the painter Pausias to a contest where she would repeatedly vary her designs and he portrayed them in his paintings, and thus it was (as Pliny the Elder described it) "in reality a contest between art and Nature". This invention is traced only to later than the 100th Olympiad via Pausias paintings. These "chaplets of flowers" became fashionable and evolved into the Egyptian chaplets using ivy, narcissus, and pomegranate blossoms. According to Pliny, P. Claudius Pulcher

In Chapter 5 of Naturalis Historia, titled “The great honour in which chaplets were held by the ancients”, Pliny explains how these head dresses were perceived:

Chaplets, however, were always held in a high degree of estimation, those even which were acquired at the public games. For it was the usage of the citizens to go down in person to take part in the contests of the Circus, and to send their slaves and horses thither as well. Hence it is that we find it thus written in the laws of the Twelve Tables: "If any person has gained a chaplet himself, or by his money, let the same be given to him as the reward of his prowess." There is no doubt that by the words "gained by his money," the laws meant a chaplet which had been gained by his slaves or horses. Well then, what was the honour acquired thereby? It was the right secured by the victor, for himself and for his parents, after death, to be crowned without fail, while the body was laid out in the house, and on its being carried to the tomb.

Pliny continues the explanation to describe the severity in which the rules of the wearing of the chaplets were enforced by the "ancients":

1. L. Fulvius, a banker, having been accused, at the time of the Second Punic War, of looking down from the balcony of his house upon the Forum, with a chaplet of roses upon his head, was imprisoned by order of the Senate, and was not liberated before the war was brought to a close.
2. P. Munatius, having placed upon his head a chaplet of flowers taken from the statue of Marsyas, was condemned by the Triumviri to be put in chains. Upon his making appeal to the tribunes of the people, they refused to intercede in his behalf
3. The daughter of the late Emperor Augustus, who, in her nocturnal debaucheries, placed a chaplet on the statue of Marsyas, conduct deeply deplored in the letters of that god.

Pliny notes that the statue of Marsyas was a meeting place for courtesans, who used to crown it with chaplets of flowers. He also notes that when Emperor Augustus's daughter Julia placed a chaplet on the statue, she was acknowledging herself to be no better than a courtesan.

The highest and rarest of all military decorations in the Roman Republic and early Roman Empire was the Grass Crown (Latin: corona graminea) . It was presented only to a general, commander, or officer whose actions saved a legion or the entire army. Examples of this would be a general who broke the blockade around beleaguered Roman troops. The crown took the form of a chaplet made from plant materials taken from the battlefield, including grasses, flowers, and various cereals such as wheat, which was presented to the general by the army he had saved.

The corona radiata, or "radiant crown" known best for adorning the Statue of Liberty, and perhaps worn by the Helios that was the Colossus of Rhodes, was worn by Roman emperors as part of the cult of Sol Invictus prior to the Roman Empire's conversion to Christianity. It was referred to as "the chaplet studded with sunbeams” by Lucian, about 180 AD.

== Examples ==
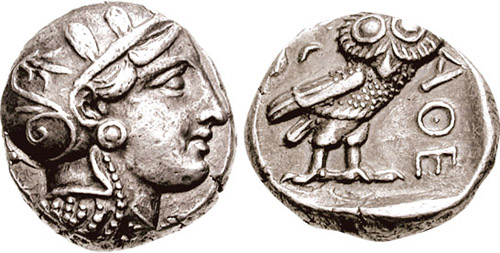
Athens coin c. 393-355 BC

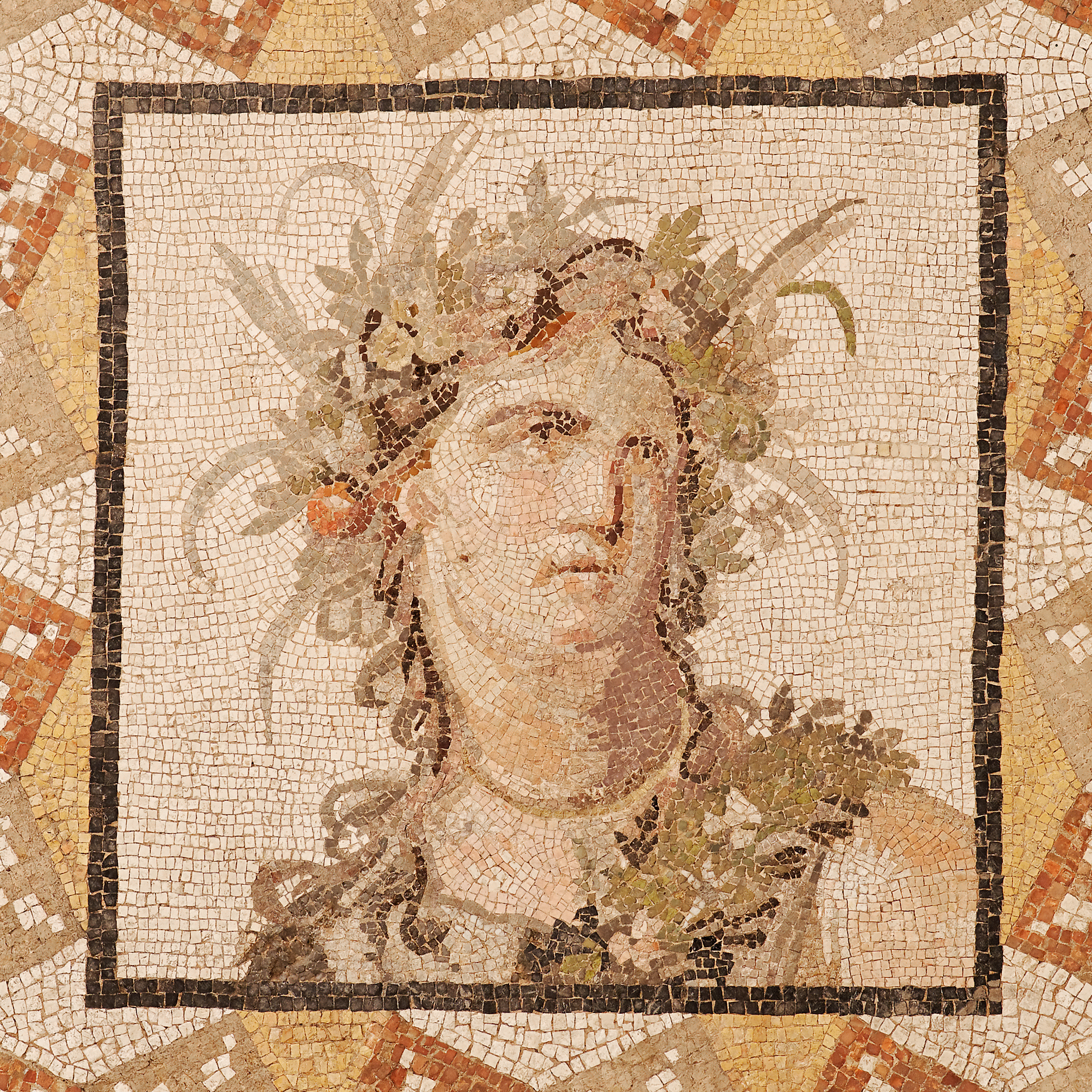
Roman Mosaic c. 2nd century AD

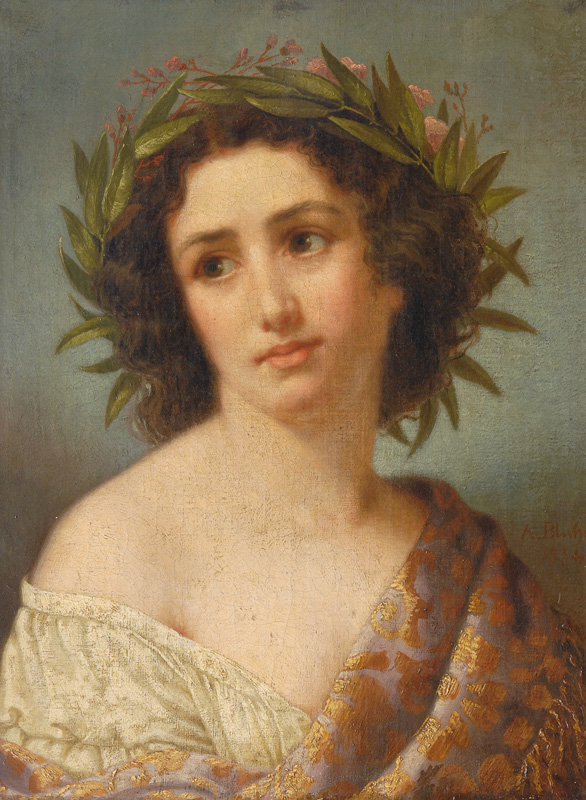
Goddess Flora

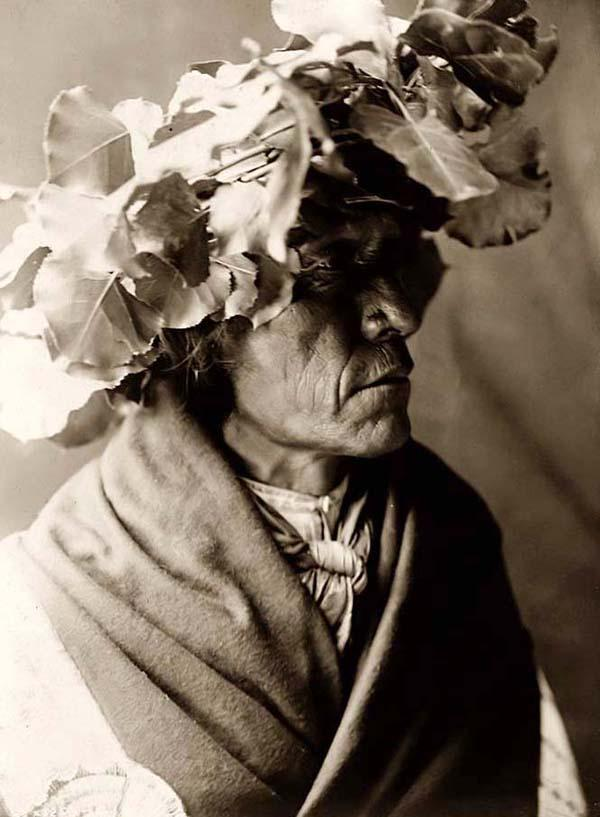
Cheyenne man wearing a wreath of cottonwood leaves

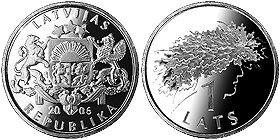
Latvian coin

== See also ==
- Corolla (headgear)
- Crancelin
- Vinok
