= Circle of stars =

Symbolic motif

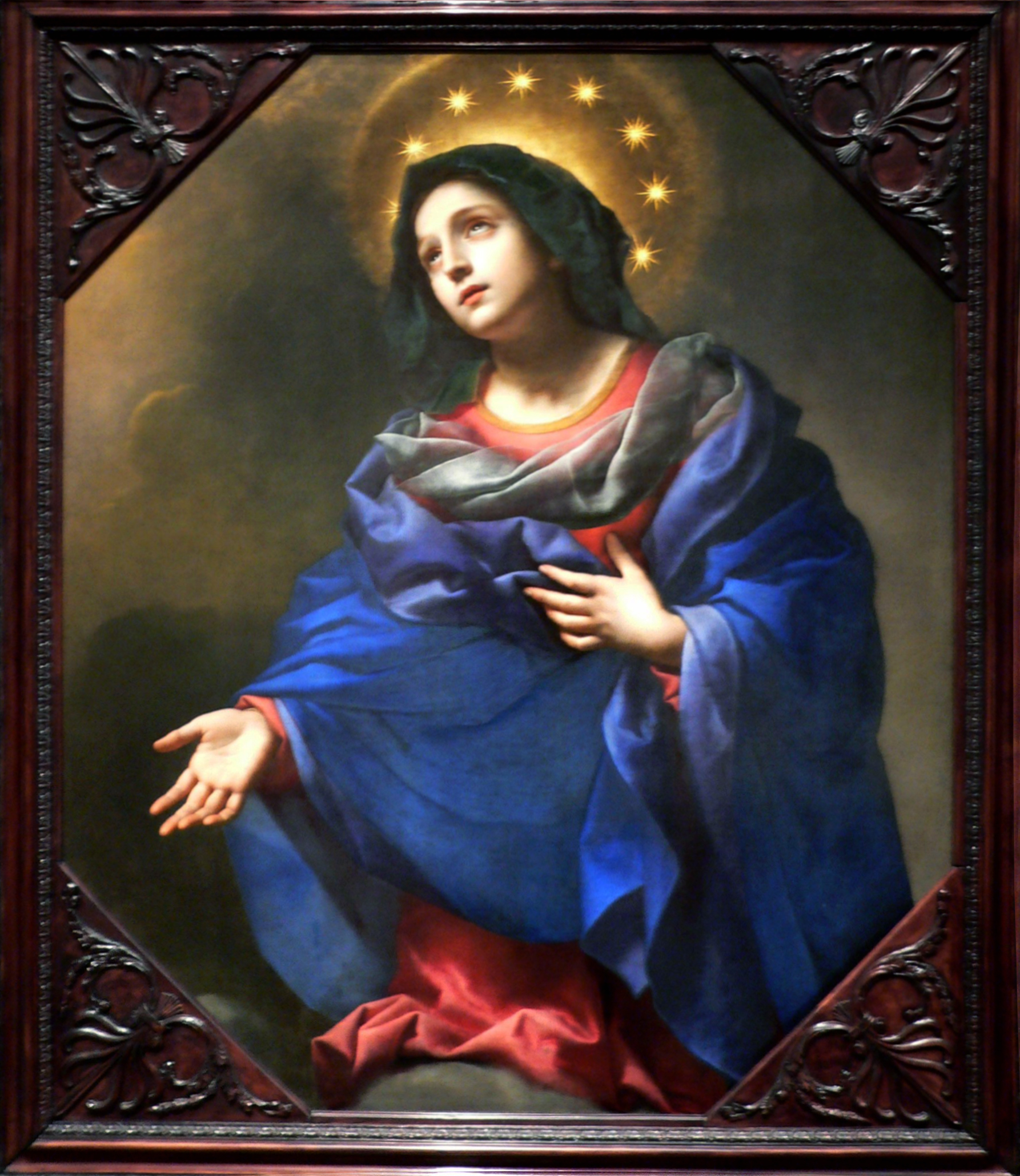
Carlo Dolci, Madonna in Glory, c. 1670, oil on canvas, Stanford Museum, California

A circle of stars often represents unity, solidarity and harmony in flags, seals and signs, and is also seen in iconographic motifs related to the Woman of the Apocalypse as well as in Baroque allegoric art that sometimes depicts the Crown of Immortality.

== Woman of the Apocalypse ==
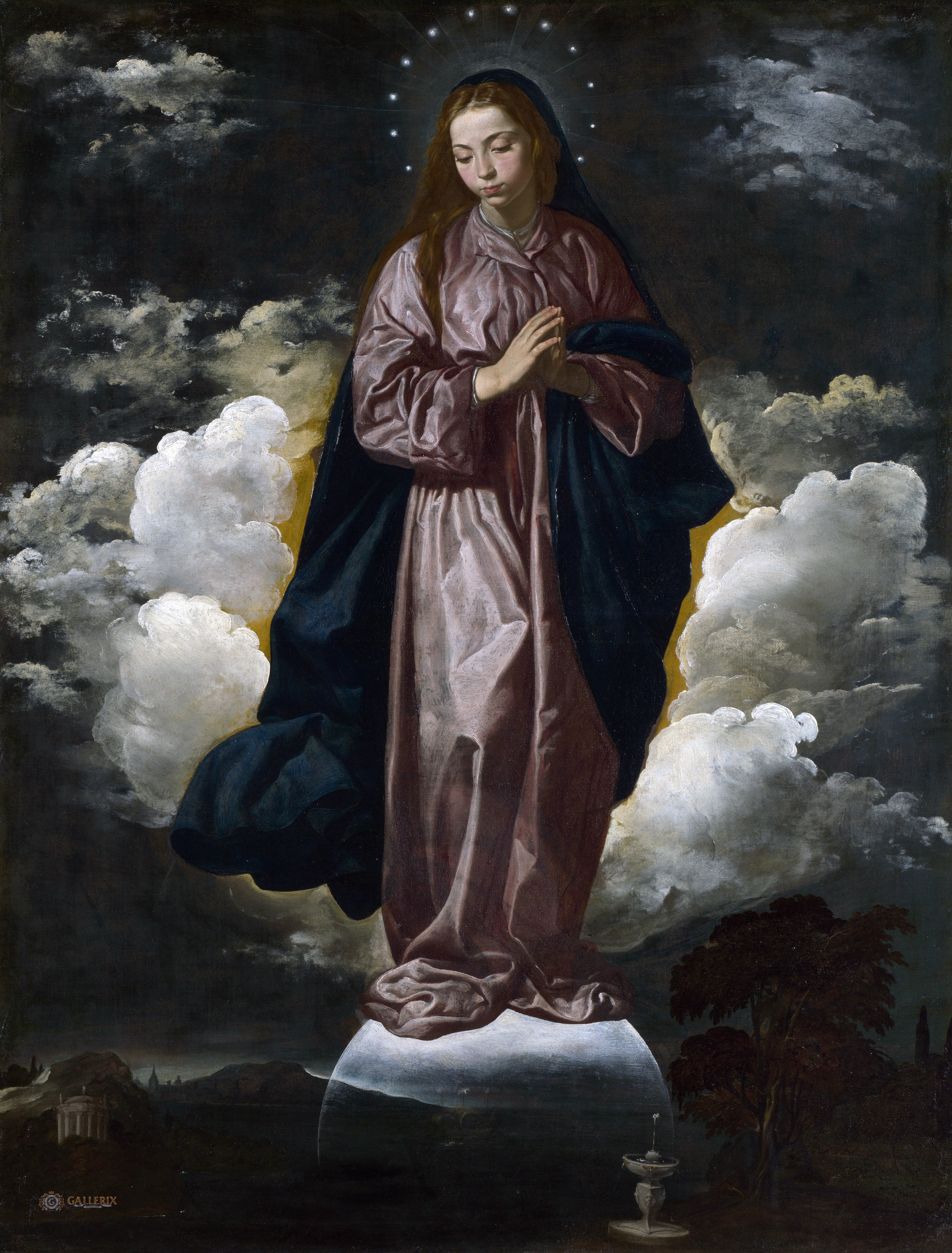
Diego Velázquez's Immaculate Conception 1618.

The New Testament's Book of Revelation (12:1, 2 & 5) describes the Woman of the Apocalypse: And there appeared a great wonder in heaven; a woman clothed with the sun, and the moon under her feet, and upon her head a crown of twelve stars. And she being with child cried, travailing in birth. .... And she brought forth a man child, who was to rule all nations with a rod of iron:and her child was caught up unto God, and to his throne. In Catholic tradition she has been identified with the Blessed Virgin Mary, especially in connection with the Immaculate Conception. Mary is often pictured with a crown or Circle of Stars.

The doctrine of the Immaculate Conception was somewhat controversial in the medieval church, and the liturgical Office for the feast was only established in 1615. In 1649, Francisco Pacheco (father-in-law of Velázquez) published his Art of Painting firmly establishing the detailed correct iconography for paintings of the Virgin of the Immaculate Conception, which included the circle of stars (he also advised the inquisition in Seville on artistic matters). This was followed by Murillo and his school in very many paintings, and influenced non-Spanish depictions.

== European Flag ==
The European flag, first adopted by the Council of Europe, consists of 12 golden stars in a circle on a blue background. The stars symbolise the ideals of unity, solidarity and harmony among the peoples of Europe. The number of stars has nothing to do with the number of member countries, though the circle is a symbol of unity.

Arsène Heitz, one of the flag designers, in 1987 revealed that his inspiration was the crown of twelve stars of the Woman of the Apocalypse, often found in modern Marian iconography. However, he did not suggest that the finished design held a religious meaning. Paul M. G. Lévy, the official responsible for the design process, denied any religious inspiration for the flag design.

== Zodiac ==
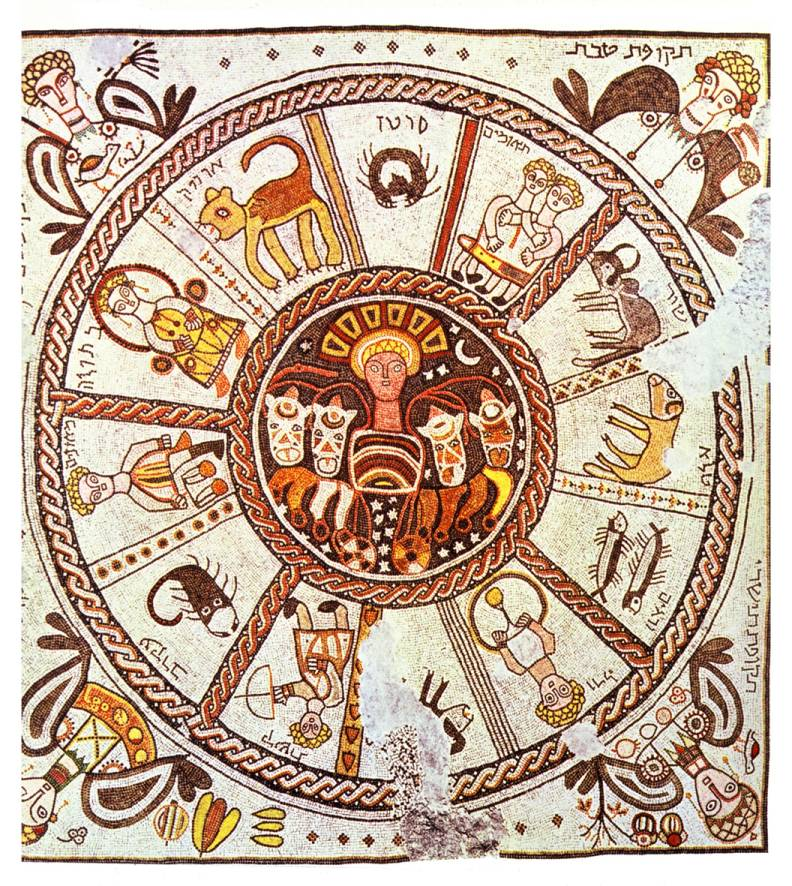
6th century synagogue Zodiac, Beit Alpha, Israel

The Zodiac is an ancient circle of stars where some stars are symbolically combined into 12 star signs also known as constellations. The etymology of the term Zodiac comes from the Latin zōdiacus, from the Greek ζῳδιακός [κύκλος], meaning "[circle] of animals", derived from ζῴδιον, the diminutive of ζῷον "animal".

== Crown of Immortality ==
The Crown of Immortality is a separate and earlier motif (and metaphor) which also uses a circle of stars. It has been widely used since the Early Church as a metaphor for the reward awaiting martyrs, but they are not depicted in art wearing a circle of stars. In art the use is mainly in Baroque allegorical compositions, and those with Ariadne.

== Art gallery ==
=== Religious ===
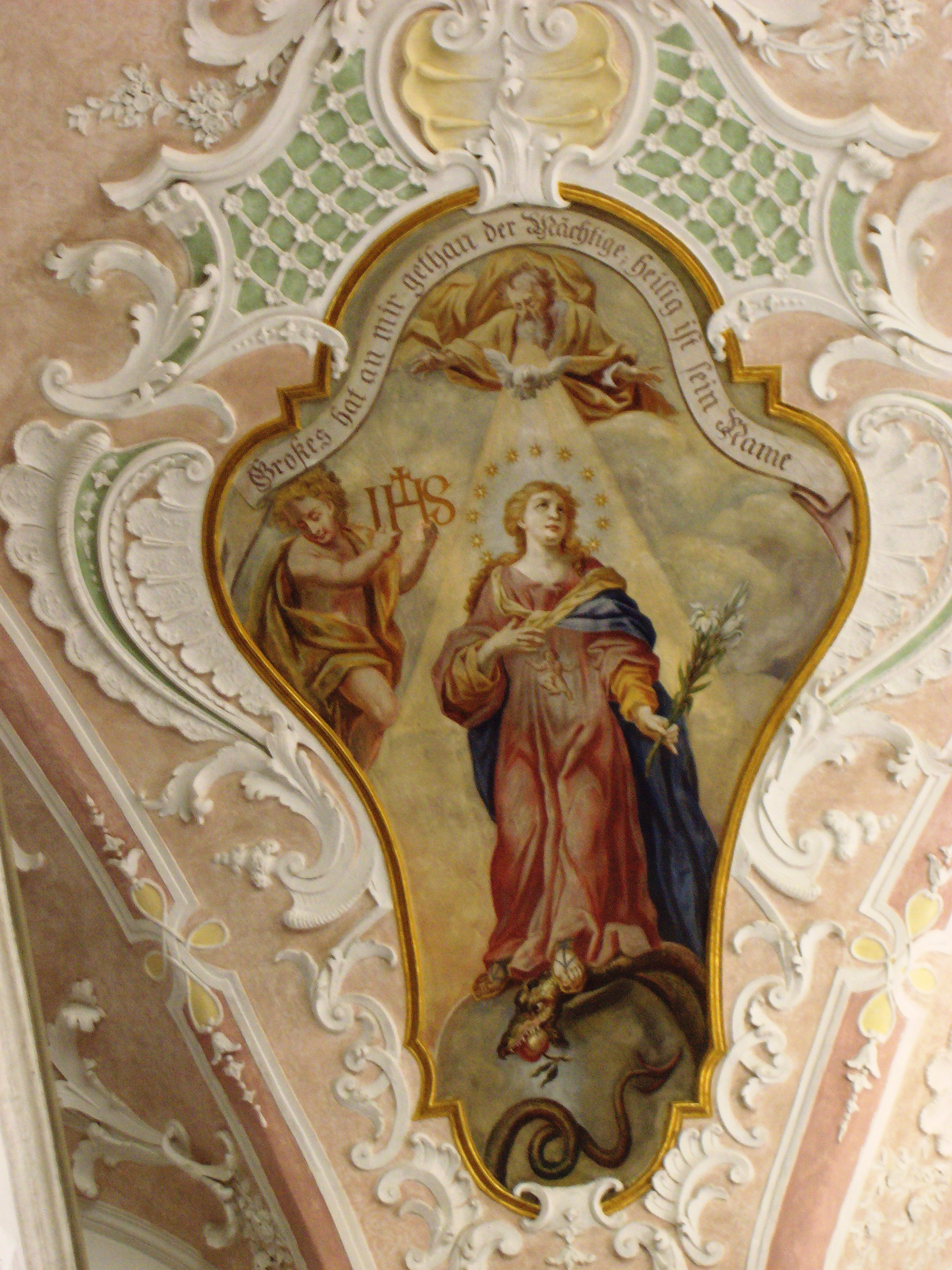
A star circle halo is found on a ceiling fresco in an Annunciation Church located in Fuchstal, a Municipality of the Bavarian district of Landsberg, Germany.

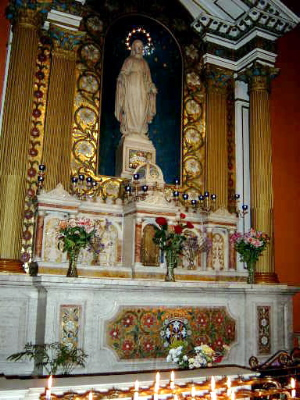
Blessed Virgin Mary in St Mary's Cathedral, Dublin (Primate of Ireland) with a star circle halo.

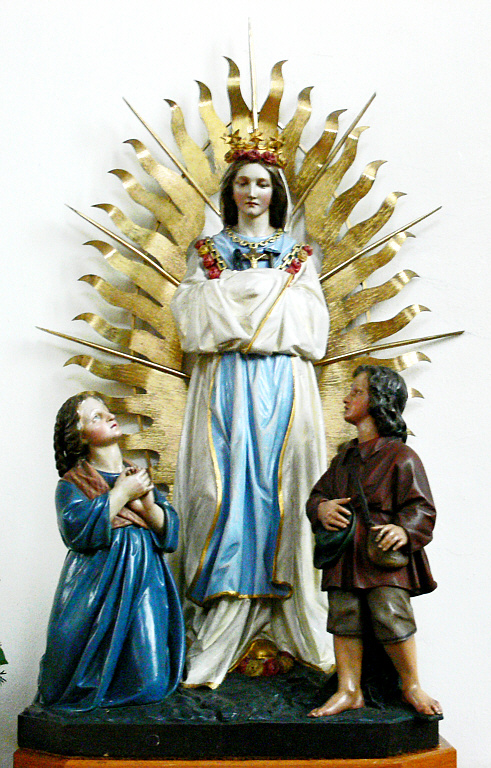
Virgin Mary with a crown of stars in La Salette, Grenoble, France.

Crown of Immortality, held by the Allegoric figure Eterna (Eternity) on the Swedish House of Knights Fresco by David Klocker Ehrenstrahl

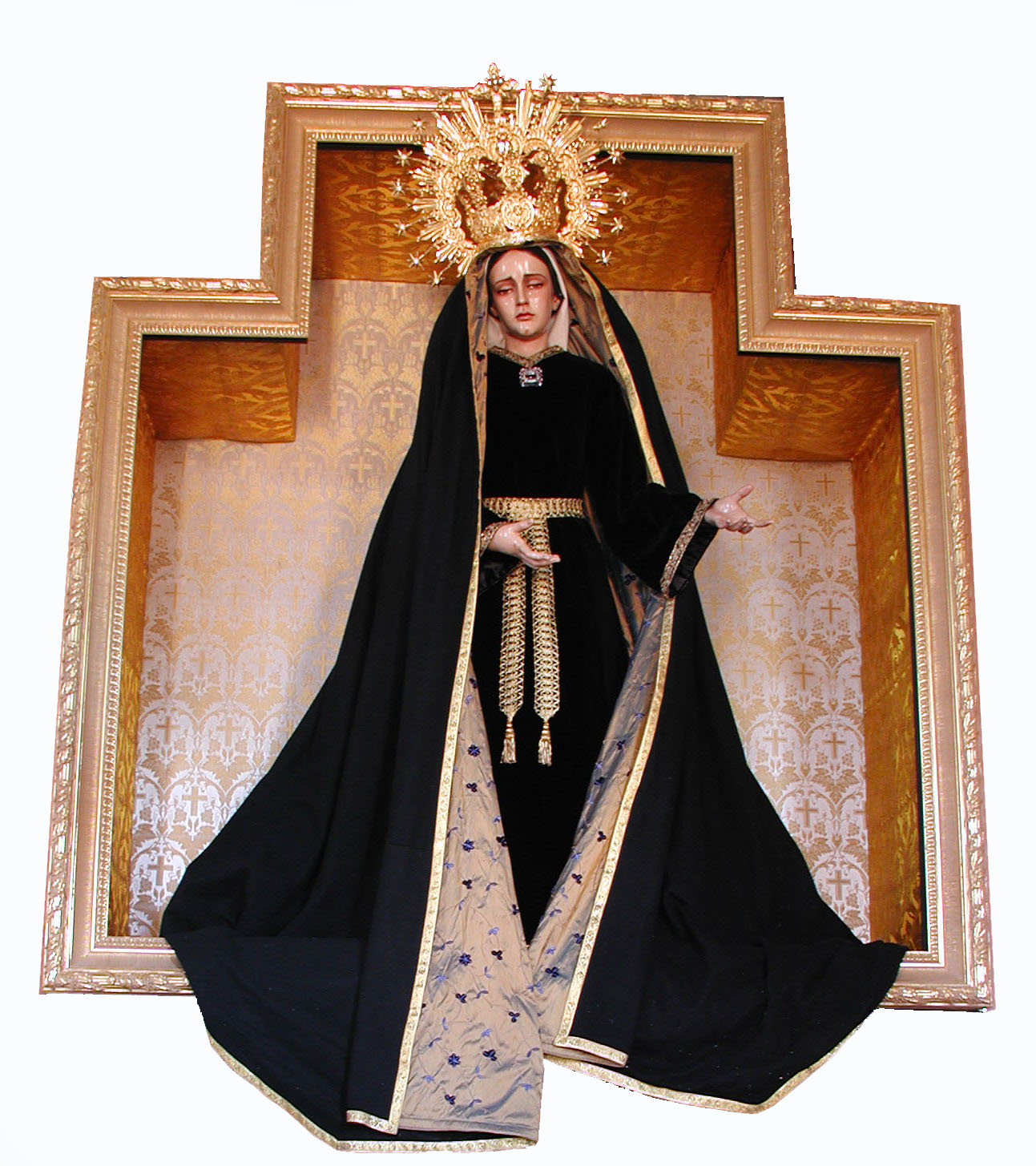
"Our Lady the Garden Enclosed", statue of Our Lady of Sorrows at the hermitage church in Warfhuizen, the Netherlands.

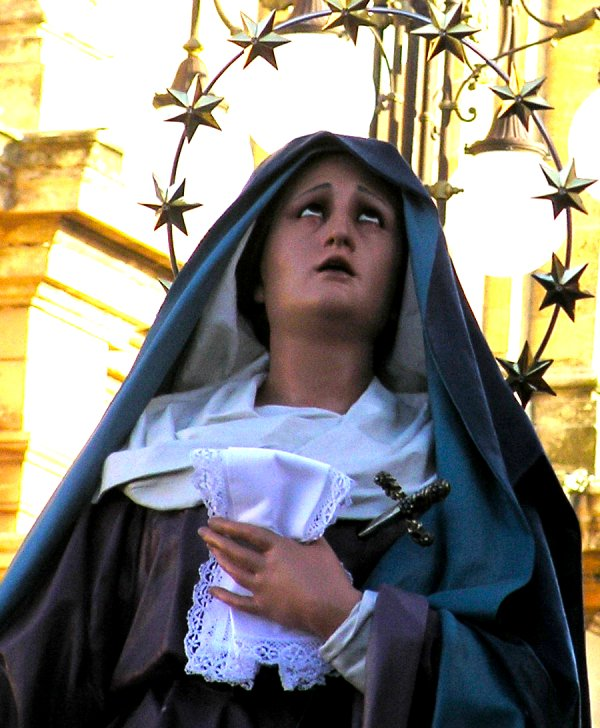
The statue of Our Lady of Sorrows, Żejtun, Malta.

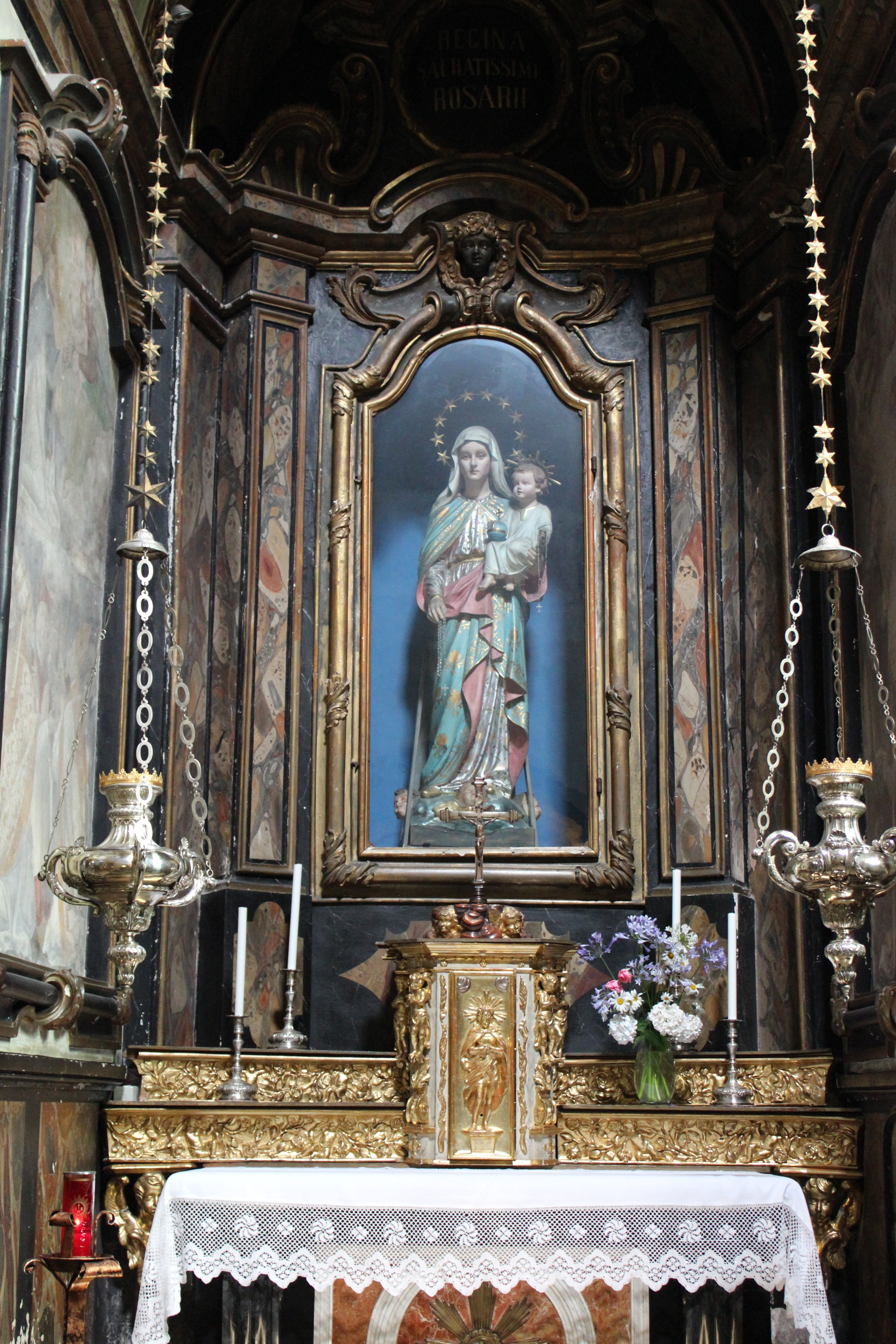
Blessed Virgin Mary Basilica di San Giulio, Orta, Italy

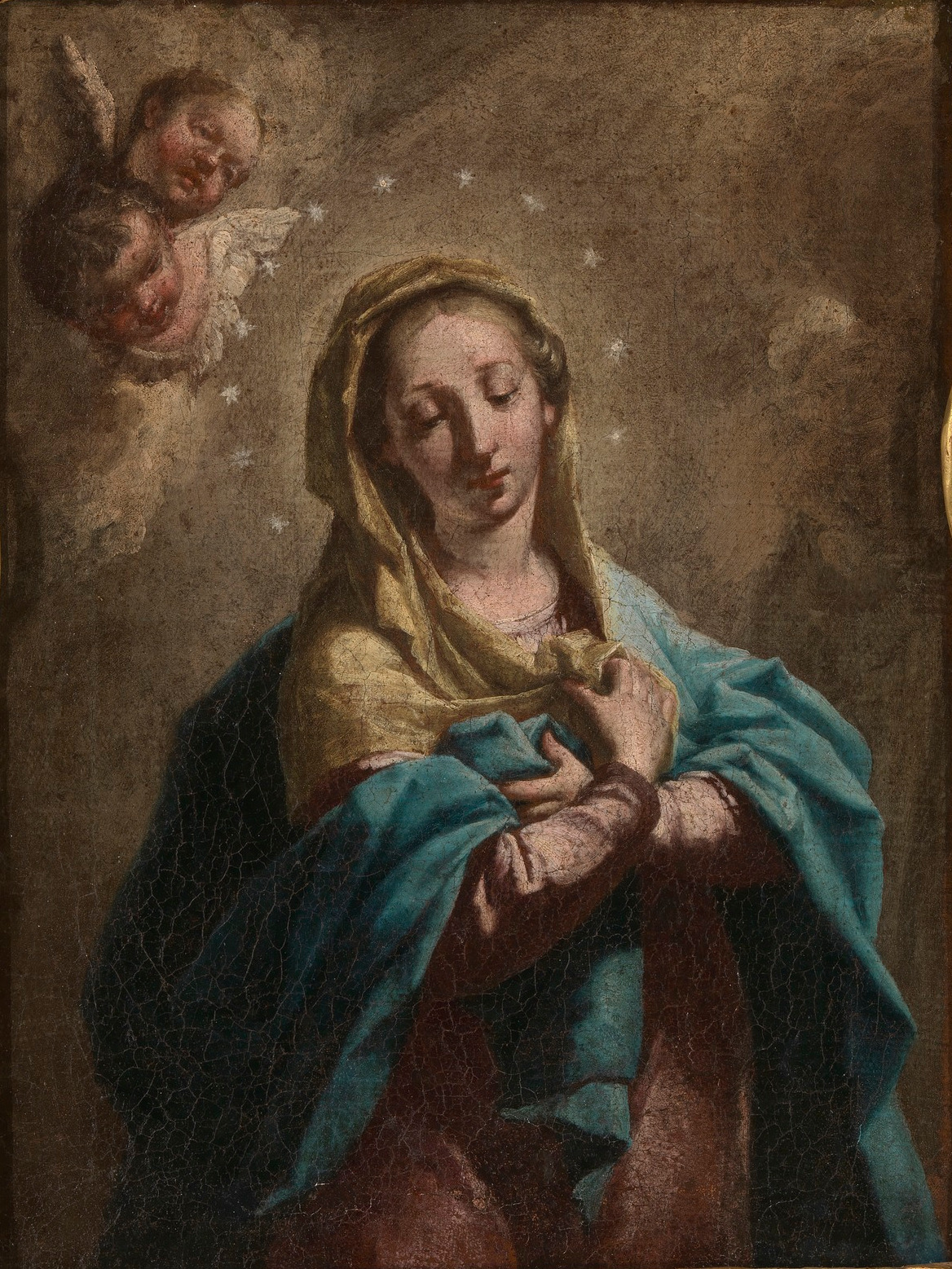
Madonna with Halo of Stars, Italy (17th century).

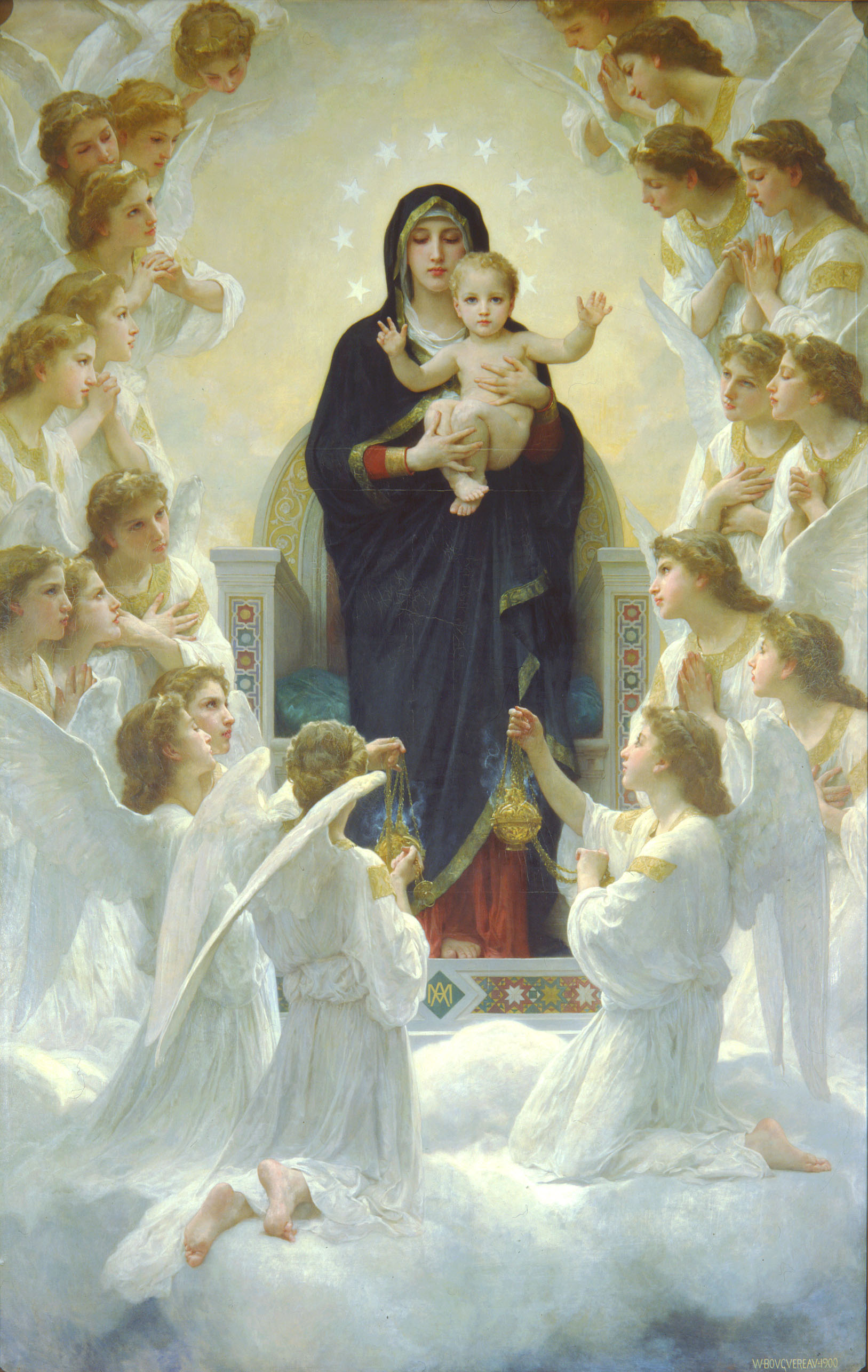
Regina Angelorum by William-Adolphe Bouguereau, 1900

=== Non religious ===
==== Flags ====
The Flag of Europe with circle of stars representing European unity

Flag of the Paneuropean Union (the stars were added after the creation of the Flag of Europe)

Flag of United States Foreign Service Officer

The Flag of FBI (early version of the Flag of the Federal Bureau of Investigation)

The Betsy Ross flag (early version of the Flag of the United States)

CSN Jack, 1861–1863

Flags of the Confederate States of America, 1861–1863

Flag of Missouri

Flag of Rhode Island

Flag of Georgia

Central Commission for Navigation on the Rhine (2015)

Flag of Myanmar, Burma, 1974–2010

United States Yacht Ensign

Flag of the Cook Islands

Flag of Cape Verde

Flag of Indiana

Flag of Louisiana (January 1861, unofficial)

Flag of Los Ríos Region, Chile

Flag of Ambazonia

Flag of the president of the United States

Flag of the vice president of the United States, 1948-1975

Flag of the Ambassadors of the United States

Flag of the Governor of Ohio

Flag of Mississippi

Flag of Ohio

Flag of Singapore

==== Seals ====
The FBI seal where the circle of stars represent unity of 13 original states.

Seal of the president of the United States

Seal of the vice president of the United States, 1948-1975

Coat of arms of Brazil

Seal of United States Air Force

Coat of arms of Brazil Imperial Coat of arms, 1853–1889

Coat of arms of Singapore

== See also ==
- Astral crown
- Celestial crown
- Crown of Immortality
