= Heraldic crown =

Emblem of a sovereign state, usually a monarchy

The German State Crown was the heraldic crown of Imperial Germany and was based on a wooden model rather than an actual crown.

A heraldic crown is often an emblem of a sovereign state, usually a monarchy, but also used by some republics.

A specific type of crown is employed in heraldry under strict rules. Indeed, some monarchies never had a physical crown, just a heraldic representation, as in the constitutional kingdom of Belgium.

Crowns are also often used as symbols of religious status or veneration, by divinities (or their representation such as a statue) or by their representatives, e.g. the Black Crown of the Karmapa Lama, sometimes used a model for wider use by devotees.

A crown can be a charge in a coat of arms, or set atop the shield to signify the status of its owner, as with the coat of arms of Norway.

== Physical and heraldic crowns ==
Sometimes, the crown commonly depicted and used in heraldry differs significantly from any specific physical crown that may be used by a monarchy.

Photograph of the physical crown of Norway	Representation of the physical crown of Norway	The heraldic crown for the King of Norway (1905 pattern)

== As a display of rank ==
If the bearer of a coat of arms has the title of baron or higher (or hereditary knight in some countries), he or she may display a coronet of rank above the shield, usually below the helm in British heraldry, and often above the crest (if any) in Continental heraldry.

In this case, the appearance of the crown or coronet follows a strict set of rules. A royal coat of arms may display a royal crown, such as that of Norway. A princely coat of arms may display a princely crown, and so on.

== Naval, civic, mural and similar crowns ==
A mural crown is commonly displayed on coats of arms of towns and some republics. Other republics may use a so-called people's crown or omit the use of a crown altogether. The heraldic forms of crowns are often inspired by the physical appearance of the respective country's actual royal or princely crowns.

Ships and other units of some navies have a naval crown, composed of the sails and sterns of ships, above the shield of their coats of arms. Squadrons of some air forces have an astral crown, composed of wings and stars. There is also the Eastern crown, made up of spikes, and when each spike is topped with a star, it becomes a celestial crown.

Whereas most county councils in England use mural crowns, there is a special type of crown that was used by Scottish county councils. It was composed of spikes, was normally shown vert (green) and had golden wheat sheaves between the spikes. Today, most of the Scottish unitary authorities still use this "wheat sheaf crown", but it is now the usual gold.

Astral crown	Camp crown	Celestial crown
Eastern crown	Mural crown	Naval crown

== Commonwealth usage ==
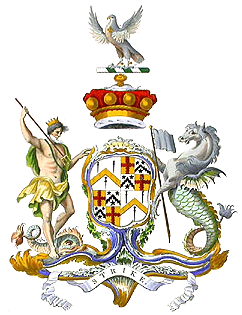
The coat of arms of the Barons Hawke displays a baronial coronet

In formal English, the word crown is reserved for the crown of a monarch and the Queen consort, whereas the word coronet is used for all other crowns used by members of the British royal family and peers of the realm.

In the British peerage, the design of a coronet shows the rank of its owner, as in German, French and various other heraldic traditions. The coronet of a duke has eight strawberry leaves, that of a marquess has four strawberry leaves and four silver balls (known as "pearls", but not actually pearls), that of an earl has eight strawberry leaves and eight "pearls" raised on stalks, that of a viscount has sixteen "pearls", and that of a peerage baron or (in Scotland) lord of parliament has six "pearls". Between the 1930s and 2004, feudal barons in the baronage of Scotland were granted a chapeau or cap of maintenance as a rank insignia. This is placed between the shield and helmet in the same manner as a peer's coronet. Since a person entitled to heraldic headgear customarily displays it above the shield and below the helm and crest, this can provide a useful clue as to the owner of a given coat of arms.

Members of the British royal family have coronets on their coats of arms, and they may wear physical versions at coronations. They are according to regulations made by King Charles II in 1661, shortly after his return from exile in France (getting a taste for its lavish court style; Louis XIV started monumental work at Versailles that year) and Restoration, and they vary depending upon the holder's relationship to the monarch. Occasionally, additional royal warrants vary the designs for individuals.

In Canadian heraldry, special coronets are used to designate descent from United Empire Loyalists. A military coronet signifies ancestors who served in Loyalist regiments during the American Revolution, while a civil coronet is used by all others. The loyalist coronets are used only in heraldry, never worn. A new royal crown, derived from the shape of the Tudor crown but with distinctly Canadian elements, was unveiled at a ceremony in Ottawa to mark the Coronation of Charles III.

Monarch: 2022 Tudor Crown	Monarch: 1901 Tudor Crown	Monarch: Crown of Scotland	Monarch: Canadian Royal Crown	Monarch: St Edward's Crown
Monarch: Imperial Crown (medieval)	Heir Apparent (Prince of Wales)	Child of a Sovereign (except the Heir Apparent) (Note: Currently, besides the younger son of the present King Charles III, the living children of a former sovereign are granted the privilege to use the crown of a Sovereign's Child; thus the King's brothers and sister also use this crown.)	Child of Heir Apparent	Grandchild of a Sovereign (Note: Currently, besides the grandchildren of the present King Charles III, the living grandchildren of a former sovereign are granted the privilege to use the crown of a Sovereign's Grandchild.)
Child of daughter of a Sovereign, if styled Highness	Duke	Marquess	Earl	Viscount
Peerage Baron/Lord of Parliament (Scotland)	Feudal Baron (Scotland)	Loyalist military coronet (Canada)	Loyalist civil coronet (Canada)	King of Arms (College of Arms)

== Continental usages ==
Precisely because there are many traditions and more variation within some of these, there is a plethora of Continental coronet types. Indeed, there are also some coronets for positions that do not exist, or do not entitle use of a coronet, in the Commonwealth tradition.

Such a case in French heraldry of the Ancien Régime, where coronets of rank did not come into use before the 16th century, is the vidame, whose coronet (illustrated) is a metal circle mounted with three visible crosses. No physical headgear of this type is known.

Helmets are often substitutes for coronets, and some coronets are worn only on a helmet.

=== Finland ===
During the Swedish reign, Swedish coronets were used. Crowns were used in the coats of arms of the historical provinces of Finland. For Finland Proper, Satakunta, Tavastia and Karelia, it was a ducal coronet; for others, a comital coronet. In 1917 with independence, the coat of arms of Finland was introduced with a grand ducal crown, but it was soon removed, in 1920. Today, some cities use coronets, e.g. Pori has a mural crown and Vaasa a Crown of Nobility.

== As a charge ==
In heraldry, a charge is an image occupying the field of a coat of arms. Many coats of arms incorporate crowns as charges. One notable example of this lies in the Three Crowns of the arms of Sweden.

Additionally, many animal charges (frequently lions and eagles) and sometimes human heads also appear crowned. Animal charges gorged (collared) of an open coronet also occur, though more often as supporters than as charges.

== Gallery ==
=== Albania ===
Lord of Albania (The Skanderbeg Helmet)

=== Andorra ===
Co-Princes

=== Bulgaria ===
Tsar	Tsaritsa	Prince
Older Princesses	Younger Princesses	

=== Croatia ===
Crown of Zvonimir

=== France ===
Capital	Department (Note: This standard has many exceptions.)	Commune

==== Ancien Régime ====
King	Heir to the throne (Dauphin)	Children and grandchildren of the sovereign (Fils de France)	Prince of the Blood
Duke and Peer of France	Duke	Marquis and peer of France	Marquis
Count and Peer of France	Count	Count (older)	Viscount
Vidame	Baron	Knight's crown	Knight's tortillon

==== Napoleonic Empire ====
Emperor (1st Empire)	Emperor (2nd Empire)	Sovereign Prince
Prince	Duke	Count
Baron	Knight	Bonnet d'honneur

==== July Monarchy ====
King of the
French

=== Georgia ===
Georgian Royal Crown,
also known as the "Iberian Crown"

=== German-speaking countries ===
==== Holy Roman Empire ====
Imperial Crown of the Holy Roman Empire	Older Imperial Crown	Newer Imperial Crown	Oldest Crown of the King of the Romans
Older Crown of the King of the Romans	Newer Crown of the King of the Romans	Crown of the King of Bohemia	Generic Crown of a King or Grand Duke
Archducal hat	Ducal hat of Styria	Oldest Electoral hat	Older Electoral hat
New Electoral hat & new Ducal hat	Ducal crown	Crown of an heir to a duchy	Princely hat (also used by Mediatized Counts)
Princely crown	Crown of a Landgrave	Older crown of a Count	Newer crown of a Count
Older crown of a Baron/Freiherr	Newer Crown of a Baron/Freiherr	Older Crown of Nobility	Newer Crown of Nobility

==== Liechtenstein ====
Prince of Liechtenstein

==== Austria ====
Mural crown of the coat of arms of Austria	Mural crown of the State of Lower Austria

===== Austrian Empire =====
Crown of the Emperor of Austria	Crown of the King of Bohemia	Archducal hat	Archducal crown
Ducal hat of Styria	Ducal hat	Ducal crown	Princely hat
Princely crown	Crown of a Count	Crown of a Baron/Freiherr	Crown of Nobility

==== Germany ====
Volkskrone (People's Crown)	Mural crown of the arms of the Berlin boroughs

===== German Empire =====
Crown of the German Emperor	Crown of the German Empress	Crown of the German Crown Prince
Crown of the King of Prussia	Crown of the King of Bavaria	Crown of the King of Württemberg

==== Hanover ====
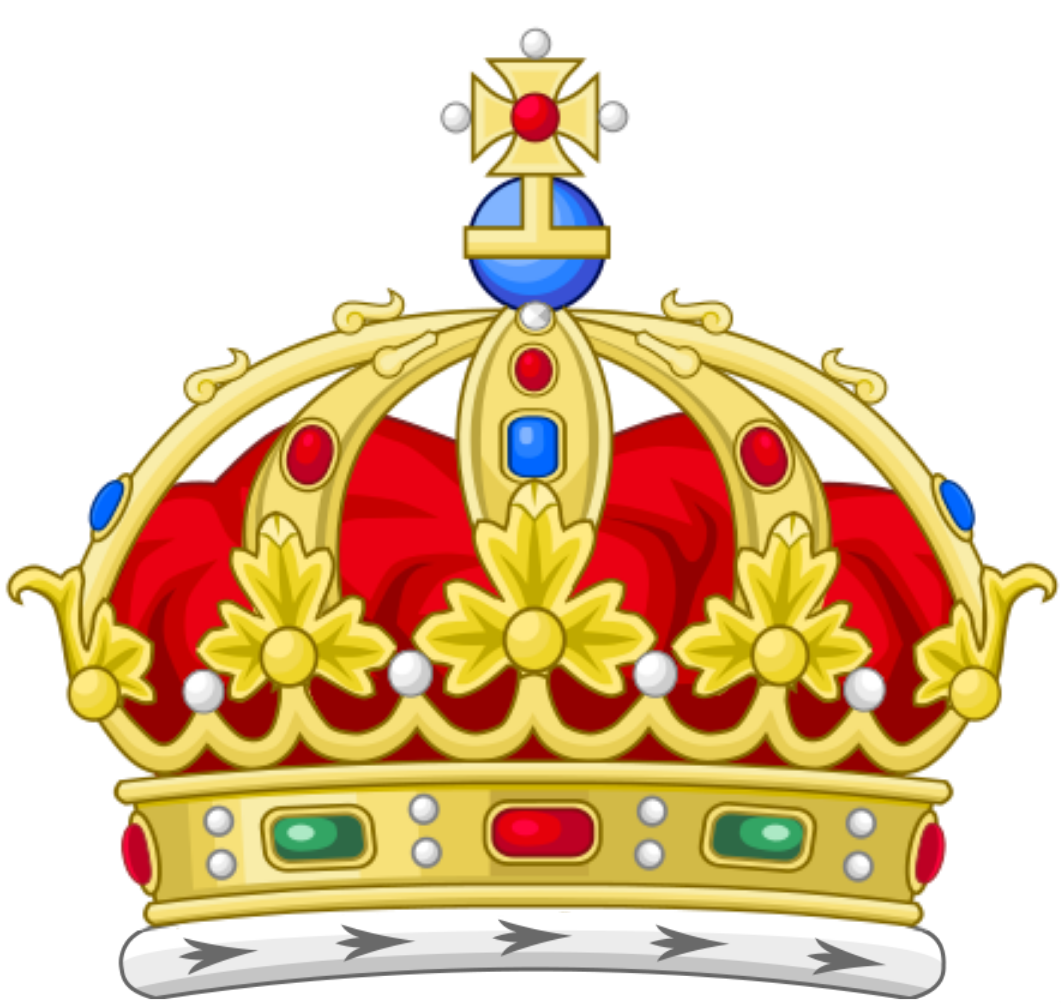
Crown of the King of Hanover

=== Greece ===
Crown of the King of the Hellenes	The Crown as it appears on the Royal Coat of Arms of Greece

=== Hungary ===
Holy Crown of Hungary

=== Italy ===
Province	City	Municipality

==== Kingdom of Italy (1861–1946) ====
King (crown of Savoy)	Queen consort	Heir to the throne (Prince of Piedmont)	Royal prince (Note: The dukes of Genoa were granted the privilege to use the crown of a royal prince though they were only princes of the blood)	Prince of the blood
Prince	Duke	Marquess	Count	Viscount
Baron	Noble	Hereditary Knight	Patrician	

==== Kingdom of Naples, Kingdom of Sicily, Two Sicilies ====
King of Naples	Heir to the throne (Duke of Calabria)	Prince and princess

==== Grand Duchy of Tuscany ====
Medici Grand Dukes of Tuscany	Habsburg-Lorraine Grand Dukes of Tuscany

==== Other Italian states before 1861 ====
Iron Crown of Lombardy	Crown of San Marino	Crown of Napoleonic Italy
Doge of Venice	Doge of Genoa	Duke of Parma

=== Low Countries ===
==== Netherlands ====
Holy Roman Emperor	King	Prince (Members of the Royal House, children of the Monarch)	Prince (Members of the Royal House, grandchildren of the Monarch)
Prince (nobility, for titles granted after 1815)	Duke	Marquess	Count
Viscount	Baron	Hereditary Knight	Jonkheer

==== Belgium ====
The older crowns are often still seen in the heraldry of older families.

King	Prince of the Royal house	Prince (nobility, for titles granted after 1815)	Prince (nobility, for titles granted during the Ancien Régime)
Duke	Marquess	Count	Count (older)
Count (oldest)	Viscount	Baron	Baron (older)
Hereditary Knight (Chevalier/Erfridder)

==== Luxembourg ====
Grand Duke

=== Monaco ===
Prince

=== Montenegro ===
Monarchy 1860–1918	Republic 2006–present

=== Poland and Lithuania ===
Heraldic Crown of the King	Crown of Bolesław I the Brave of Poland	Grand Duke	Prince
Count	Baron	Nobleman	

=== Portugal ===
Overseas province (1930–1999)	Administrative region (not implemented)	Capital city
City	Town	Civil Parish

==== Kingdom of Portugal (until 1910) ====
King	Heir apparent to the throne (Prince Royal)	Second in the line of succession (Prince of Beira)	Infante	Duke
Marquess	Count	Viscount	Baron	Knight / Fidalgo

=== Romania ===
Capital	City
Town	Village

==== Kingdom of Romania ====
King
(The Steel Crown of Romania)

=== Russia ===
Emperor	Empress	Crown of Congress Poland	Crown of the Grand Duchy of Finland
Altabas cap	Monomakh's Cap	Kazan cap	Prince
Count	Baron	Baron (alternative style)	Crown of Nobility

=== Nordic countries ===
==== Denmark ====
King	Crown Prince	Prince (royal family)	Duke
Marquess	Count	Baron	Crown of Nobility

==== Iceland ====
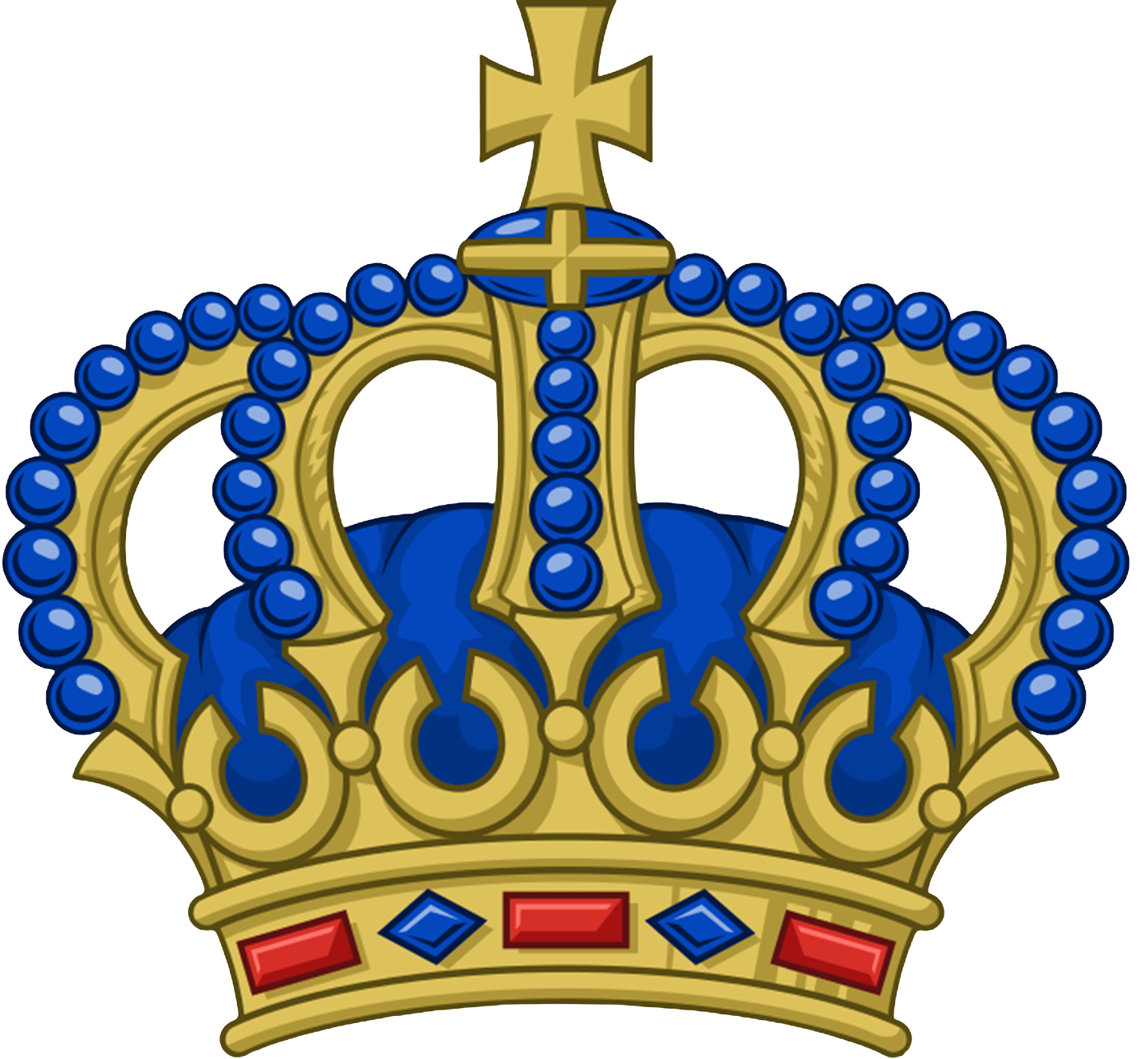
King

==== Finland ====
Physical crown design of the King	Generic Grand ducal crown used in late 19th to early 20th c.	Grand ducal crown used in the state coat of arms 1917–1920
Ducal coronet	Comital coronet	Mural crown

==== Norway ====
Heraldic crown of the King	Physical crown of the King	Physical crown of the Queen	Crown Prince	Prince or Princess
Duke	Marquess	Count	Baron	Crown of Nobility

==== Sweden ====
King/Queen	Crown Prince/Crown Princess	Prince/Princess (aka Duke/Duchess)
Count/Countess	Baron/Baroness	Untitled Nobility

=== Serbia ===
Emperor (medieval)	King (after 1903)
Coat of arms design (1882–1918; 2004–2010)	Coat of arms design (after 2010)

=== Spain ===
King (National arms design)	King (Monarch's arms design)	King (Aragon, Catalonia, Balearics, Valencia)	Heir to the throne (Prince of Asturias)
Heir to the throne (Prince of Girona) (Aragon, Catalonia, Balearics, Valencia)	Infante	Infante (Aragon, Catalonia, Balearics, Valencia)	Grandee of Spain
Duke	Marquess	Count	Viscount
Baron	Señor/Don (Lord)	Hidalgo (Nobleman)	Knight's burelete

=== Ukraine ===
Kingdom of Ruthenia

Crown of Ruthenia

=== Non-European usages ===
==== Bahrain ====
King

==== Bhutan ====
King (Raven Crown)

==== Brazil ====
Capital of State of the Federation	City	Town	Village

===== Empire of Brazil =====
Emperor	Heir apparent to the throne (Prince Imperial)	Second in the line of succession (Prince of Grão-Pará)
Prince	Duke	Marquess
Count	Viscount	Baron

==== Brunei ====
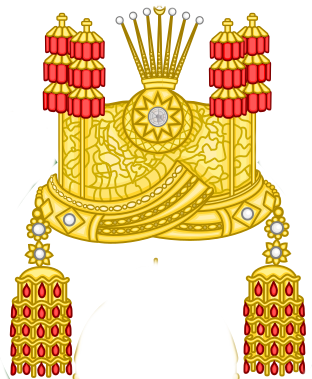
Crown of Brunei Darussalam

==== Cambodia ====
Crown of the Kingdom of Cambodia

==== Central African Empire ====
Emperor

==== Chile ====
Municipal Mural Crown	Royal Crown of Easter Island

==== China ====
Mianguan (Ming dynasty)	Chaoguan (Qing dynasty)

==== Egypt ====
Wali (1854–1867) and Khedive (1867–1914)	Sultan (1914–22)	King (1922–53)
Pharaoh of Upper and Lower Egypt	Hemhem	Atef
King of Lower Egypt	King of Upper Egypt	Queen
Shuti	Blue Crown	Cap Crown

==== Ethiopia ====
Emperor

==== Fiji ====
Crown of Fiji

==== Haiti ====
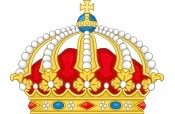
Emperor (2nd Empire)

==== Hawaii ====
Crown of Hawaii

==== Indonesia ====
Sultanate of Yogyakarta	Sunanate of Surakarta

==== Iran ====
Crown of the Shah of Persia	Crown of the Shah of Iran

==== Iraq ====
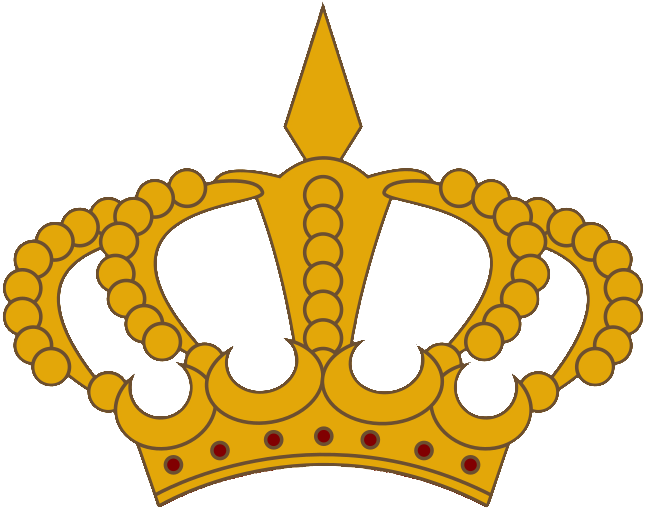
Crown of Iraq

==== Jordan ====
Crown of Jordan

==== Libya ====
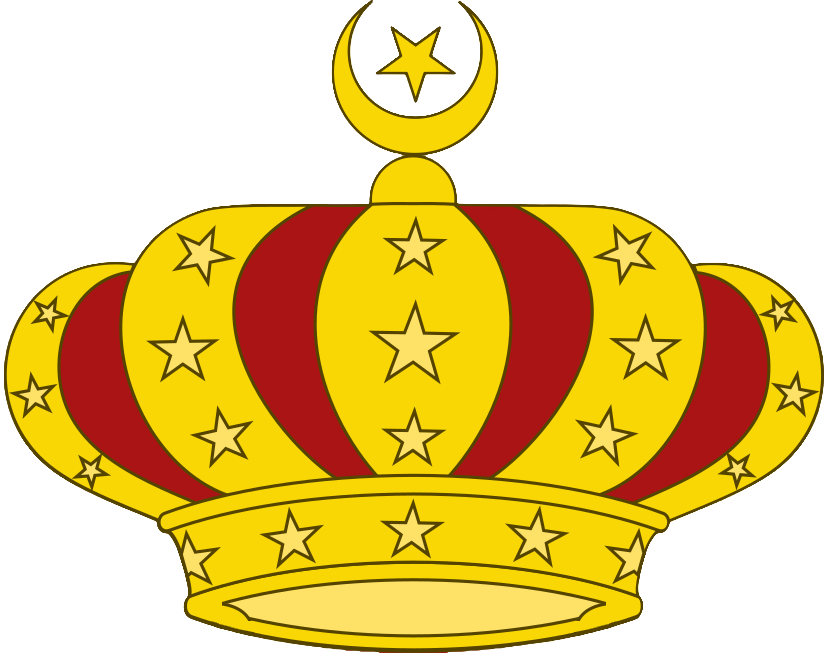
Crown of Libya

==== Kyrgyzstan ====
Crown of Kara-Kygyz Khanate

==== Malaysia ====
Sultan of Kelantan	Sultan of Terengganu

==== Mexico ====
Emperor (1st Empire)	Emperor (2nd Empire)	Prince (1st and 2nd Empire)

===== Aztec Empire =====
Moctezuma's Headdress	Headdress of the Aztec Monarchs

==== Morocco ====
Heraldic Crown of Morocco

==== Nepal ====
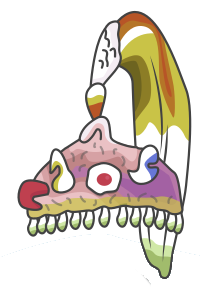
Crown of Nepal

==== Oman ====
Crown of Oman

==== Peru ====
Mascaipacha of the Sapa Inca

==== Rwanda ====
Crown of the Kingdom of Rwanda

==== Saudi Arabia ====
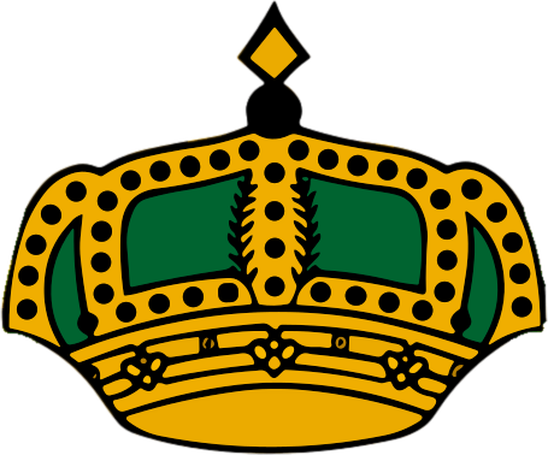
Crown of Saudi Arabia

==== Siam and Thailand ====
Great Crown of Victory of the King of Siam and Thailand	Phra Kiao (princely coronet, also the emblem of King Chulalongkorn)	Coronet of the Crown prince of Siam/Thailand

==== Tahiti ====
Crown of Tahiti

==== Tonga ====
Crown of Tonga

=== Other examples ===
Twig crown of the Republic of the Congo	College of Arms Foundation of the United States

=== Ecclesiastical Hats ===
==== Anglican Communion ====
Archbishop or Bishop	Archdeacon	Dean	Members of His Majesty's; Ecclesiastical Household
Canons, Honorary Canons, Canons Emeritus and Prebendaries	Priest	Deacon	

==== Catholic Church ====
Pope	Patriarch	Cardinal	Metropolitan Archbishop
Archbishop	Eastern Catholic prelate, combining elements of both Eastern and Western ecclesiastical heraldry	Apostolic protonotary (Monsignor)	Honorary Prelate (Monsignor)
Chaplain of His Holiness (Monsignor)	Bishop	Abbot	Canon
Dean	Priest		

== See also ==
- Crown jewels
- Imperial crown
- List of monarchies
- Coronet
