= Crown of Immortality =

Literary and religious metaphor

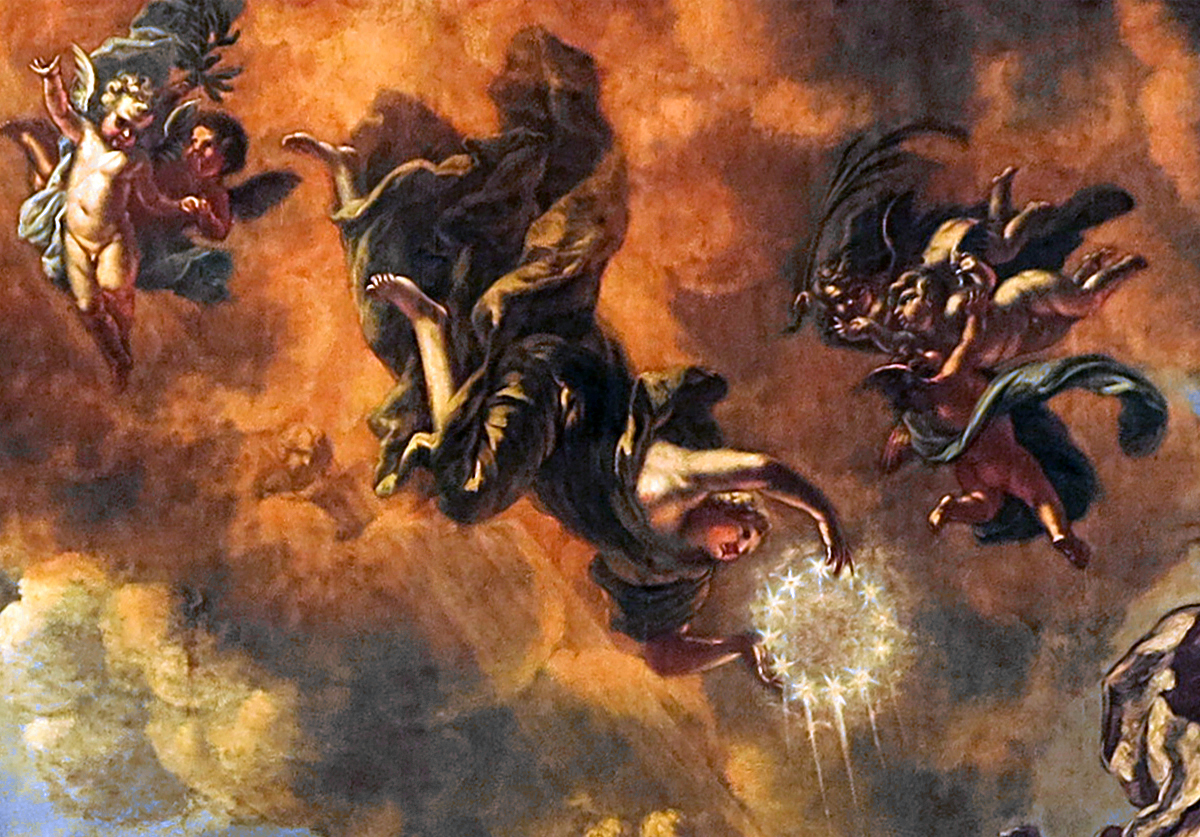
The Crown of Immortality, held by the allegorical figure Eterna (Eternity) on the Swedish House of Knights fresco by David Klöcker Ehrenstrahl

The Crown of Immortality is a literary and religious metaphor traditionally represented in art first as a laurel wreath and later as a symbolic circle of stars (often a crown, tiara, halo or aureola). The Crown appears in a number of Baroque iconographic and allegoric works of art to indicate the wearer's immortality.

== Wreath crowns ==
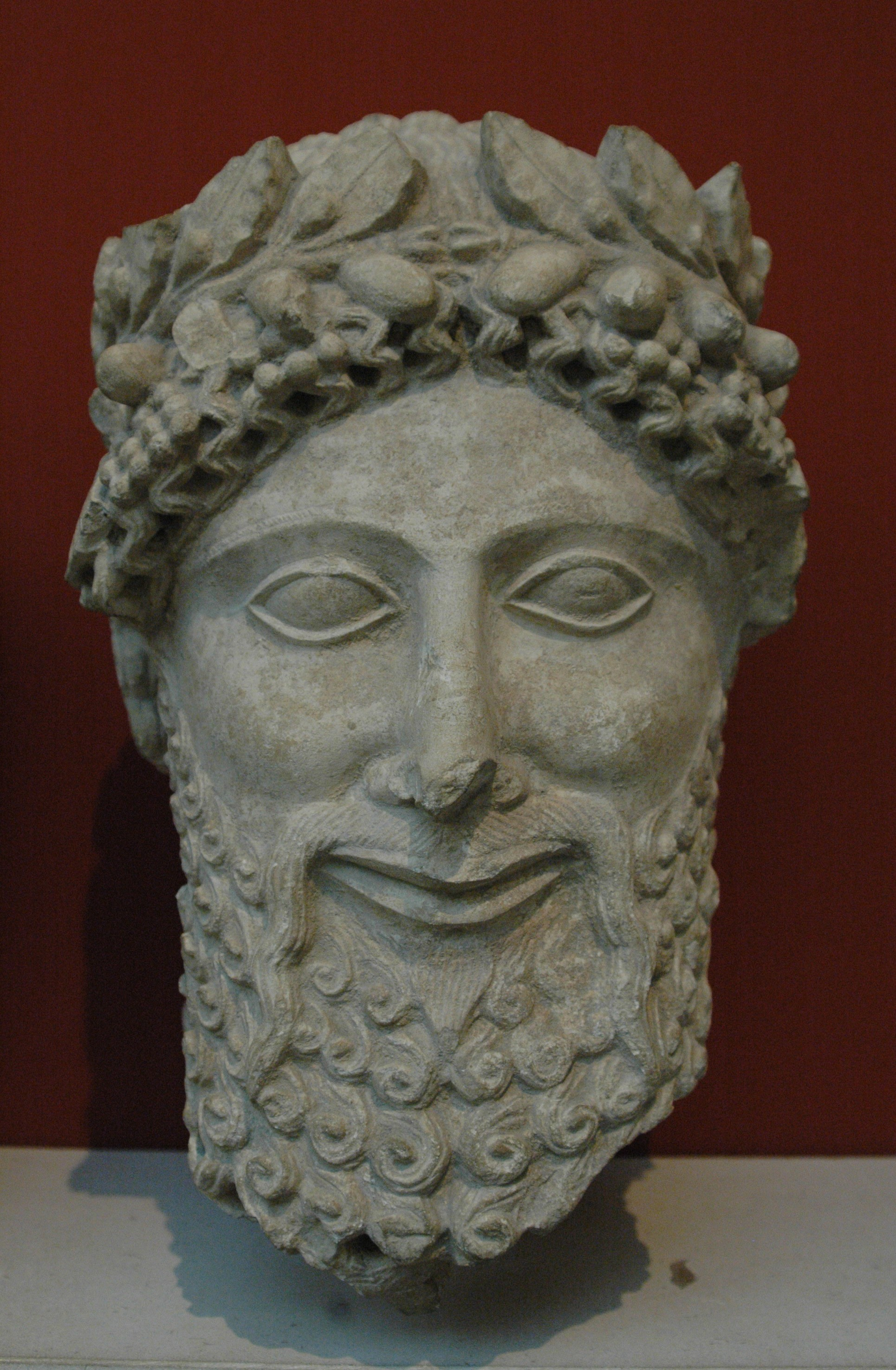
Wreathed worshipper of Apollo, from Cyprus, 475-450 BC

In ancient Egypt, the crown of justification was a wreath placed on the deceased to represent victory over death in the afterlife, in emulation of the resurrecting god Osiris. It was made of various materials including laurel, palm, feathers, papyrus, roses, or precious metals, with numerous examples represented on the Fayum mummy portraits of the Roman Imperial period.

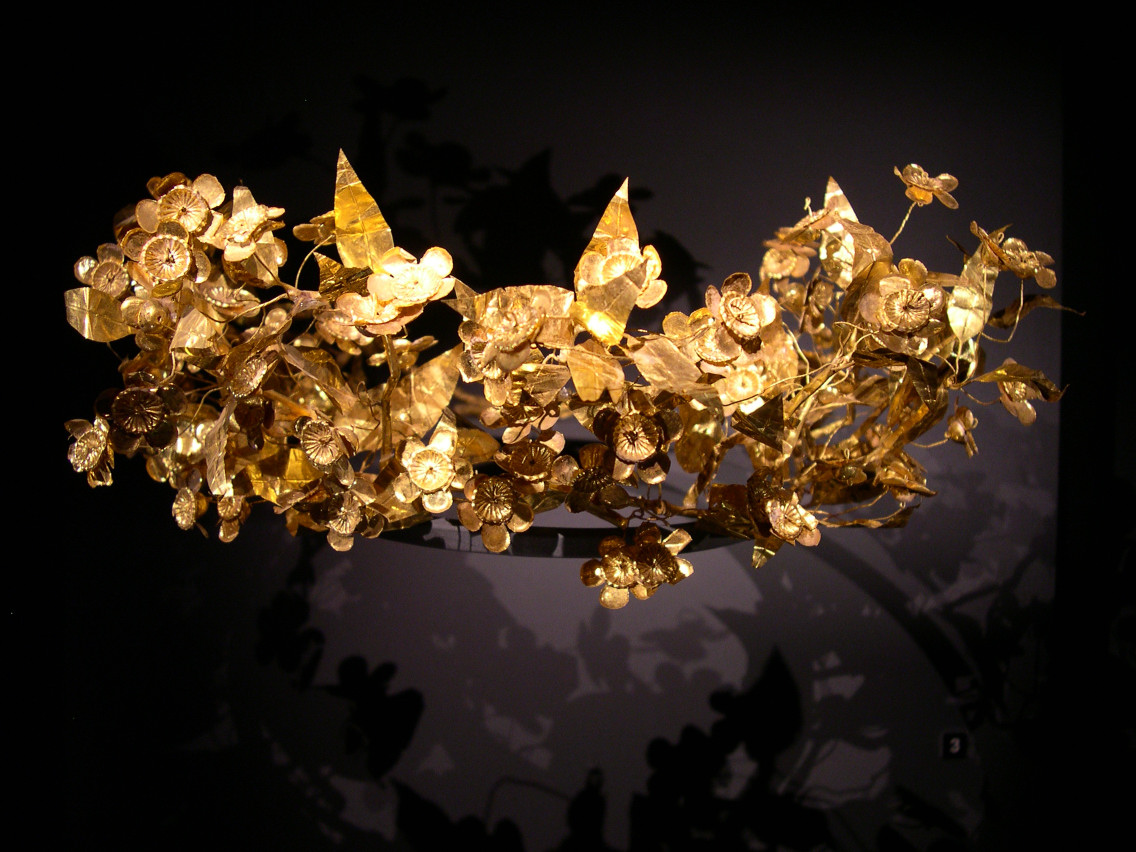
Gold wreath from ancient Macedonia

In ancient Greece, a wreath of laurel or olive was awarded to victorious athletes and later poets. Among the Romans, generals celebrating a formal triumph wore a laurel wreath, an honor that during the Empire was restricted to the Imperial family. The placing of the wreath was often called a "crowning", and its relation to immortality was problematic; it was supposed to secure the wearer immortality in the form of enduring fame, but the triumphator was also reminded of his place within the mortal world: in the traditional tableaux, an accompanying slave whispered continually in the general's ear Memento mori, "Remember you are mortal". Funerary wreaths of gold leaf were associated particularly with initiates into the mystery religions.

From the Early Christian era the phrase "crown of immortality" was widely used by the Church Fathers in writing about martyrs; the immortality was now both of reputation on earth, and of eternal life in heaven. The usual visual attribute of a martyr in art, was a palm frond, not a wreath. The phrase may have originated in scriptural references, or from incidents such as this reported by Eusebius (Bk V of History) describing the persecution in Lyon in 177, in which he refers to literal crowns, and also brings in an athletic metaphor of the "victor's crown" at the end:

"From that time on, their martyrdoms embraced death in all its forms. From flowers of every shape and color they wove a crown to offer to the Father; and so it was fitting that the valiant champions should endure an ever-changing conflict, and having triumphed gloriously should win the mighty crown of immortality. Maturus, Sanctus, Blandina, and Attalus were taken into the amphitheater to face the wild beasts, and to furnish open proof of the inhumanity of the heathen, the day of fighting wild beasts being purposely arranged for our people. There, before the eyes of all, Maturus and Sanctus were again taken through the whole series of punishments, as if they had suffered nothing at all before, or rather as if they had already defeated their opponent in bout after bout and were now battling for the victor's crown."

The first use seems to be that attributed to the martyr Ignatius of Antioch in 107.

=== Advent wreath ===
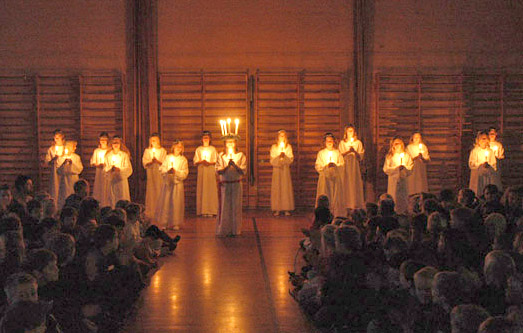
Candle-crowned Danish girls in a Lucia procession, 2001

An Advent wreath is a ring of candles, usually made with evergreen cuttings and used for household devotion by some Christians during the season of Advent. The wreath is meant to represent God's eternity. On Saint Lucy's Day, December 13, it is common to wear crowns of candles in Sweden, Denmark, Norway, Finland, Italy, Bosnia, Iceland, and Croatia.

Before the reform of the Gregorian calendar in the 16th century, St. Lucy's Day fell on the winter solstice. The representation of Saint Lucy seems to derive from the Roman goddess Lucina, who is connected to the solstice.

== Crown of martyrdom ==
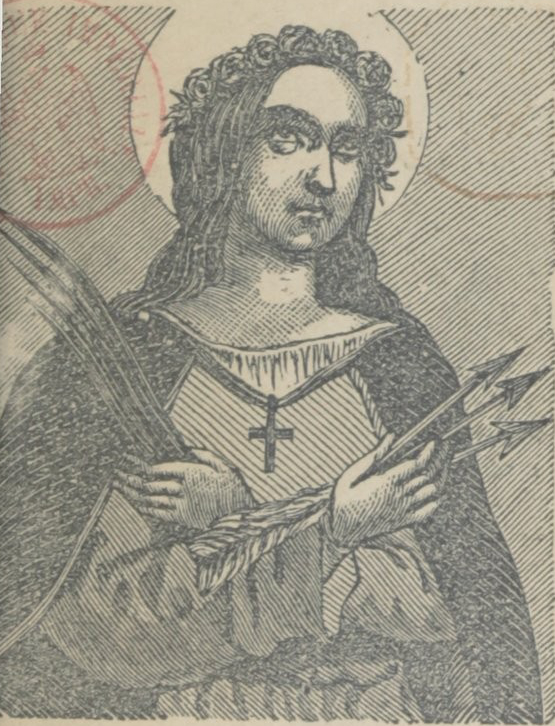
Blandina with a martyr's crown

Martyrs often are idealized as combatants, with the spectacle of the arena transposed to the martyr's struggle with Satan. Ignatius of Antioch, condemned to fight beasts in the year 107, "asked his friends not to try to save him and so rob him of the crown of immortality." In 155, Polycarp, Christian bishop of Smyrna, was stabbed after a failed attempt to burn him at the stake. He is said to have been " … crowned with the wreath of immortality ... having through patience overcome the unjust governor, and thus acquired the crown of immortality." Eusebius uses similar imagery to speak of Blandina, martyred in the arena at Lyon in 177:

A small, weak, despised woman, who had put on Christ, the great invincible champion, and in bout after bout had defeated her adversary and through conflict had won the crown of immortality. Emblem of Christian martyrs, The Crown or wreath of Immortality, is a reward for those who stayed faithful until death. (1 Corinthians 9:24-27, James 1:12, and Revelation 2:10)

== Crown of stars ==
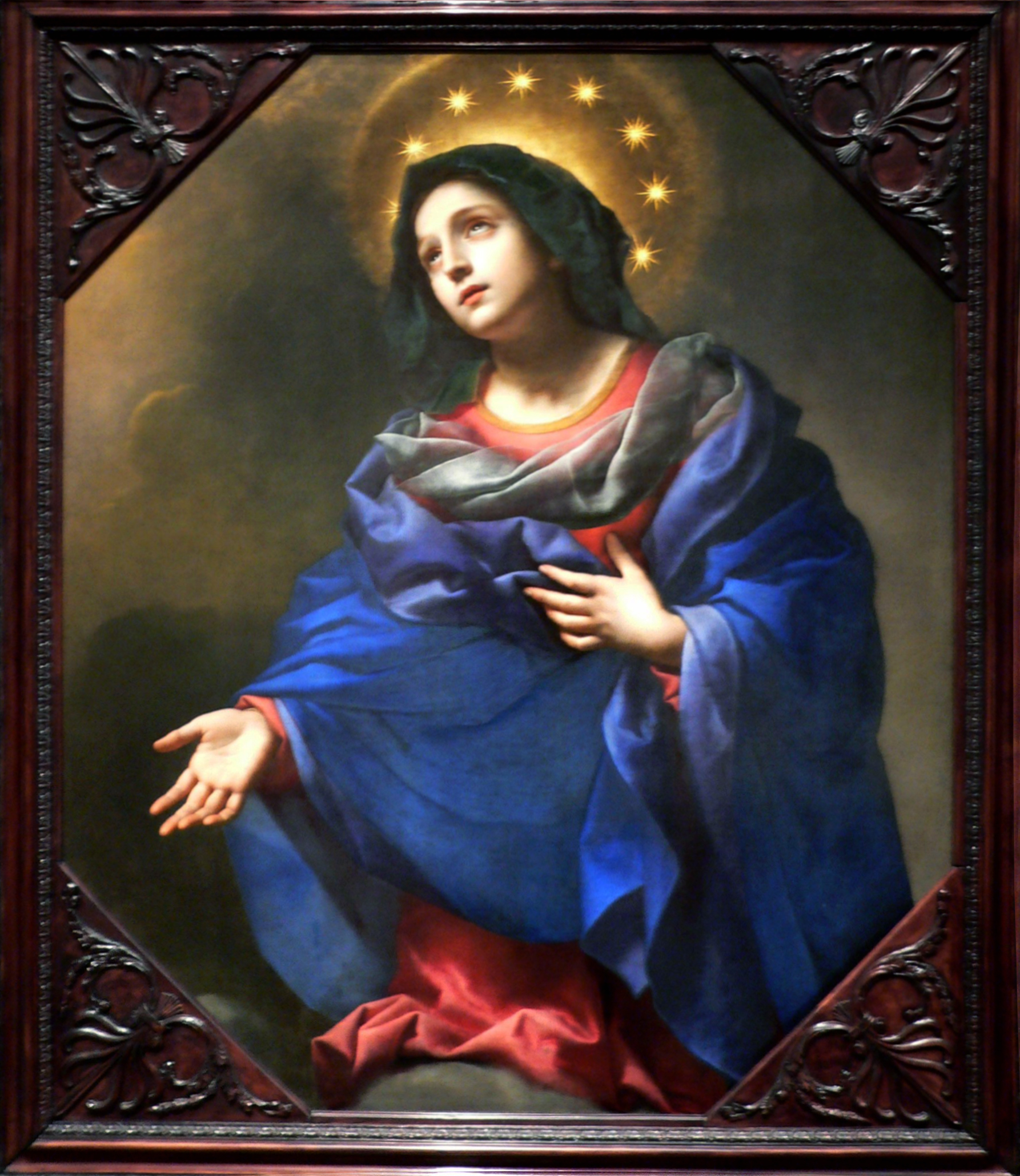
Carlo Dolci, Madonna in Glory, c. 1670, oil on canvas, Stanford Museum, California

The crown of stars, representing immortality, may derive from the story of Ariadne, especially as told by Ovid, in which the unhappy Ariadne is turned into a constellation of stars, the Corona Borealis (Crown of the North), modelled on a jewelled crown she wore, and thus becoming immortal. In Titian's Bacchus and Ariadne (1520–23, National Gallery, London), the constellation is shown above Ariadne's head as a circle of eight stars (though Ovid specifies nine), very similar to what would become the standard depiction of the motif. Although the crown was probably depicted in classical art, and is described in several literary sources, no classical visual depictions have survived. The Titian therefore appears to be the earliest such representation to survive, and it was also at this period that illustrations in prints of the Apocalypse by artists such as Dürer and Jean Duvet were receiving very wide circulation.

In Ariadne, Venus and Bacchus, by Tintoretto (1576, Doge's Palace, Venice), a flying Venus crowns Ariadne with a circle of stars, and many similar compositions exist, such as the ceiling of the Egyptian Hall at Boughton House of 1695.

== Allegorical development ==
The first use of the crown of stars as an allegorical Crown of Immortality may be the ceiling fresco, Allegory of Divine Providence and Barberini Power (1633–39), in the Palazzo Barberini in Rome by Pietro da Cortona. Here a figure identified as Immortality is flying, with her crown of stars held out in front of her, near the centre of the large ceiling. According to the earliest descriptions she is about to crown the Barberini emblems, representing Pope Urban VIII, who was also a poet. Immortality seems to have been a preoccupation of Urban; his funeral monument by Bernini in St Peter's Basilica in Rome has Death as a life-size skeleton writing his name on a scroll.

Two further examples of the Crown of Immortality can be found in Sweden, firstly in the great hall ceiling fresco of the Swedish House of Knights by David Klöcker Ehrenstrahl (between 1670–1675) which pictures among many allegoric figures Eterna (eternity) who holds in her hands the Crown of Immortality. The second is in Drottningholm Palace, the home of the Swedish Royal Family, in a ceiling fresco named The Great Deeds of The Swedish Kings, painted in 1695 by David Klöcker Ehrenstrahl. This has the same motif as the fresco in the House of Knights mentioned above. The Drottningholm fresco, was shown in the 1000th stamp by Czesław Słania, the Polish postage stamp and banknote engraver.

The crown was also painted by the French Neoclassical painter Louis-Jean-François Lagrenée, 1725–1805, in his Allegory on the Death of the Dauphin, where the crown was held by a young son who had pre-deceased the father (alternative titles specifically mention the crown of Immortality).

== Poems, texts and writing ==
- Edward Grim wrote about Thomas Becket, Archbishop of Canterbury who was murdered on December 29, 1170 as the person "...promised by God to be the next to receive the crown of immortality...".
- The preface to Percy Bysshe Shelley's 1818 poem The Revolt of Islam contain: "Should the public judge that my composition is worthless, I shall indeed bow before the tribunal from which Milton received his crown of immortality...".
- A Latter Day Saints scripture, Doctrine and Covenants 81:6, contain: "And if thou art faithful unto the end thou shalt have a crown of immortality, and eternal life in the mansions which I have prepared in the house of my Father."

== Gallery ==
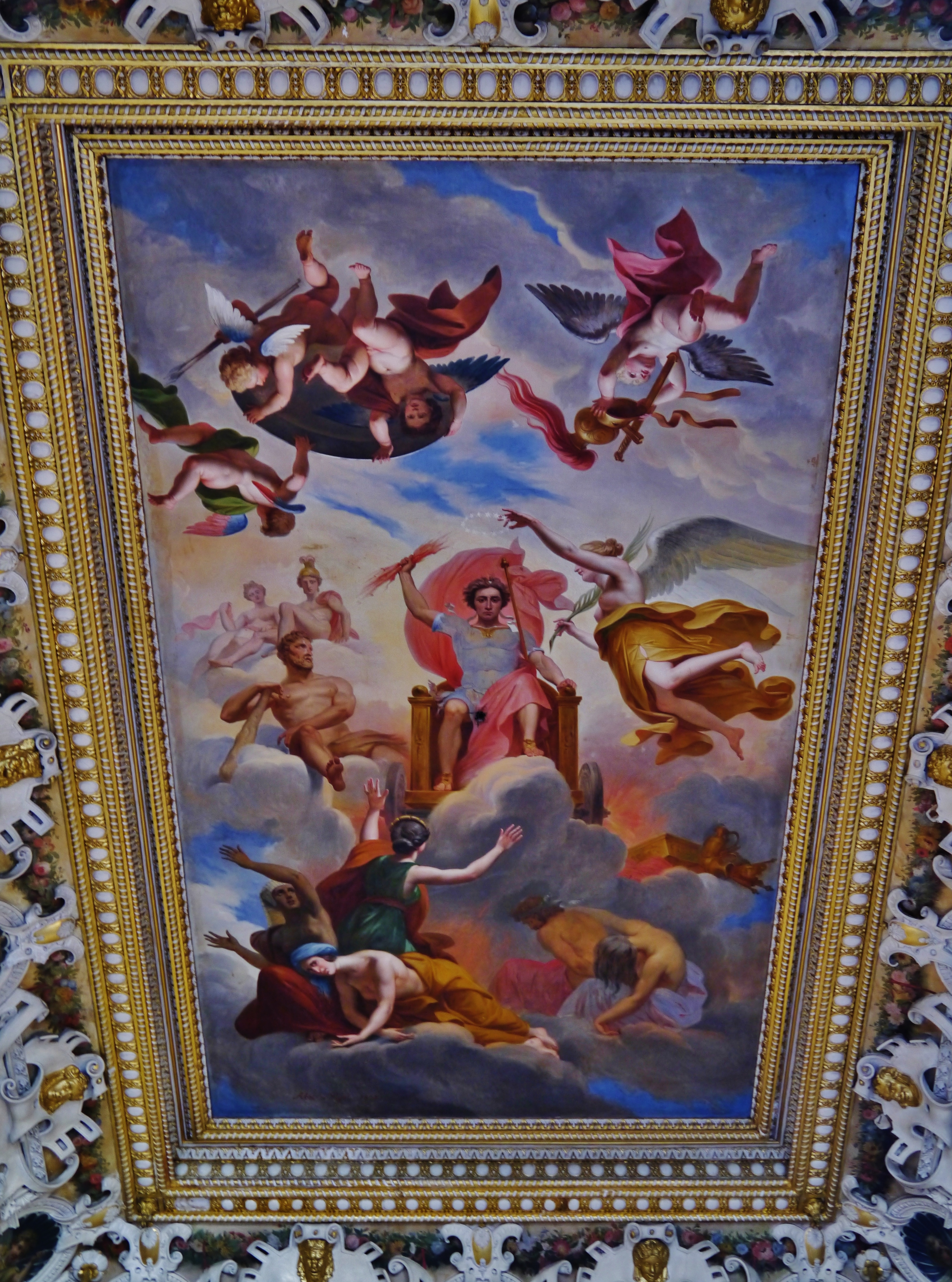
Fontainbleau

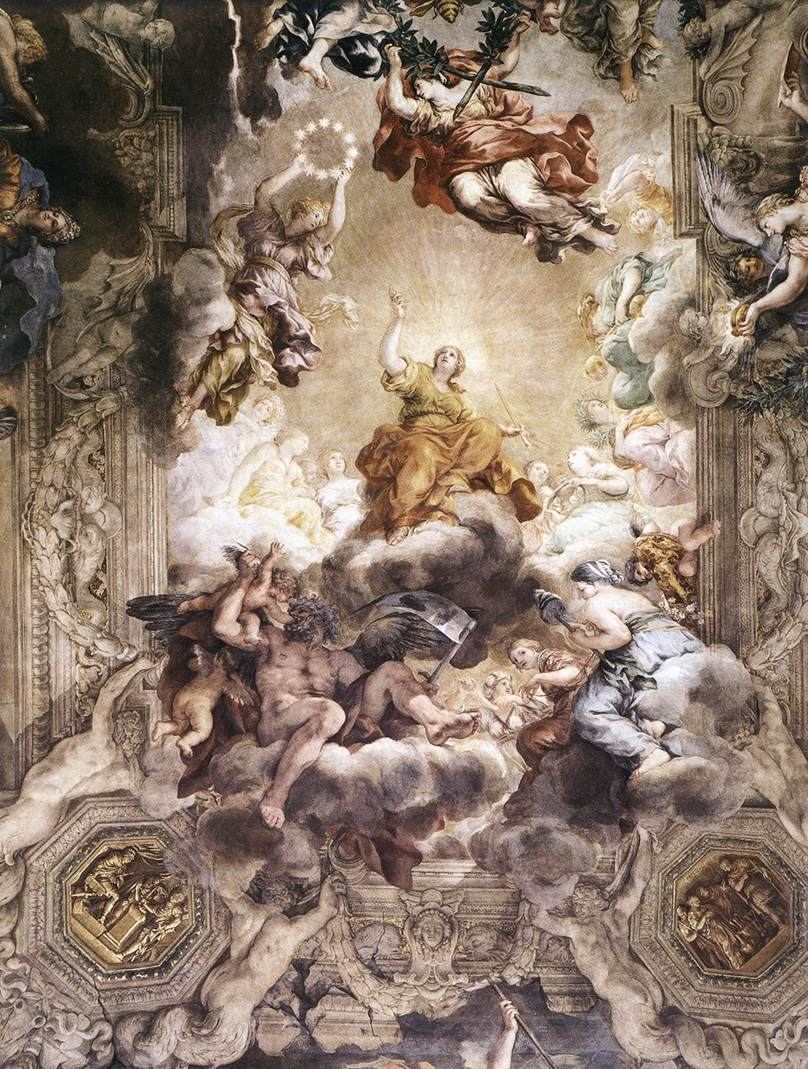
Allegory of Divine Providence and Barberini Power, by Pietro da Cortona (1633 -1639)

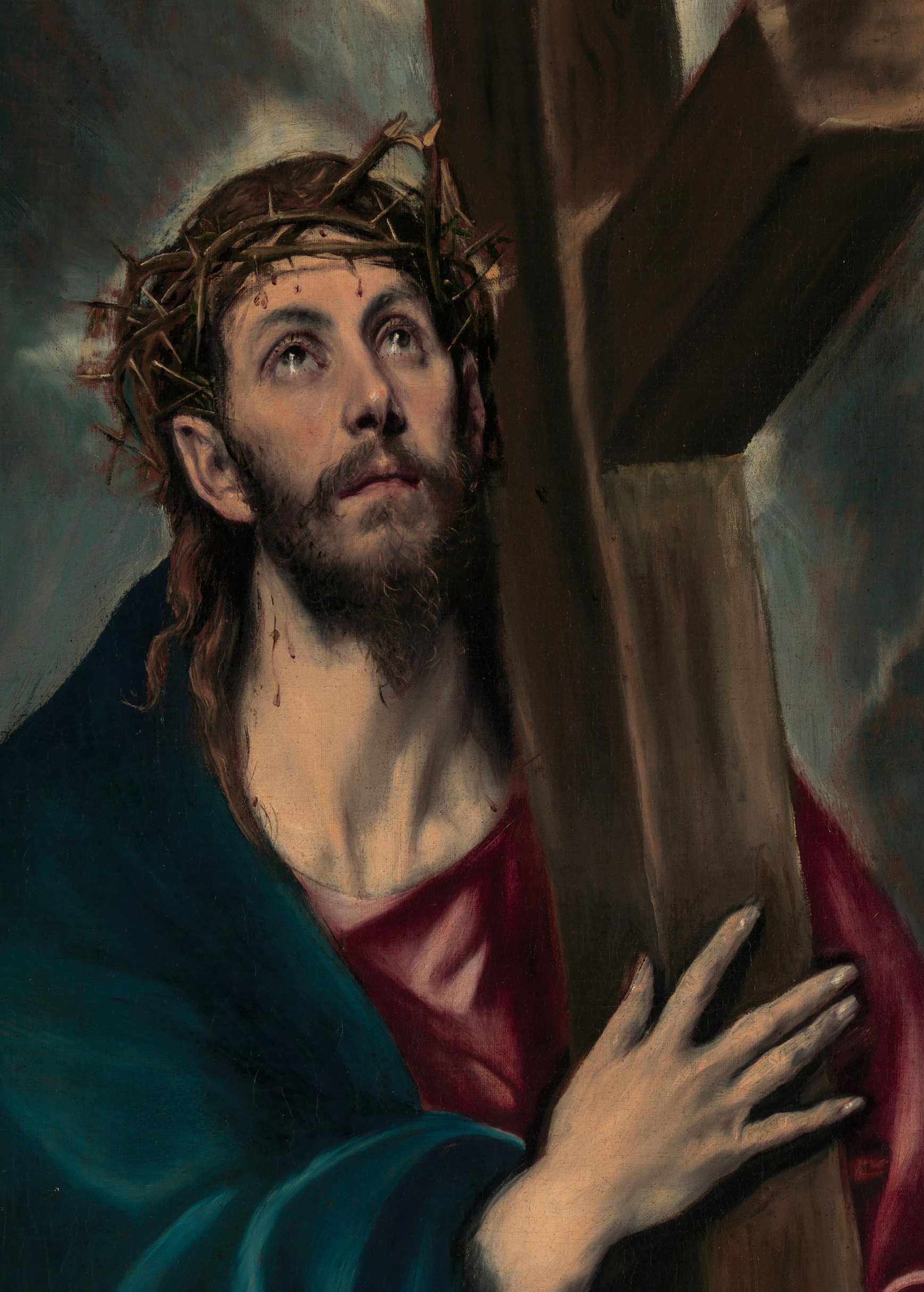
Christ Carrying the Cross detail, Jesus with Crown of Thorns by El Greco, 1580

== See also ==
- Allegory
- Halo (religious iconography)
- Circle of stars
- Astral crown
- Celestial crown
- Five Crowns
- Iconography
