= Flag of Sarawak =

- Use: Civil and state flag
- Proportion: 1:2
- Adopted: 31 August 1988; 38 years ago

The flag of Sarawak, officially known as Ibu Pertiwi ('Motherland'), is the official flag of Sarawak, a state in Malaysia. It is based on the flag of the Raj of Sarawak of the White Rajah, and includes the yellow of Southeast Asian royalty — a similar yellow and diagonal black are in the flag of Brunei, although Brunei's yellow is of a brighter shade.

== History of the Sarawak Flag during the reign of James Brooke ==
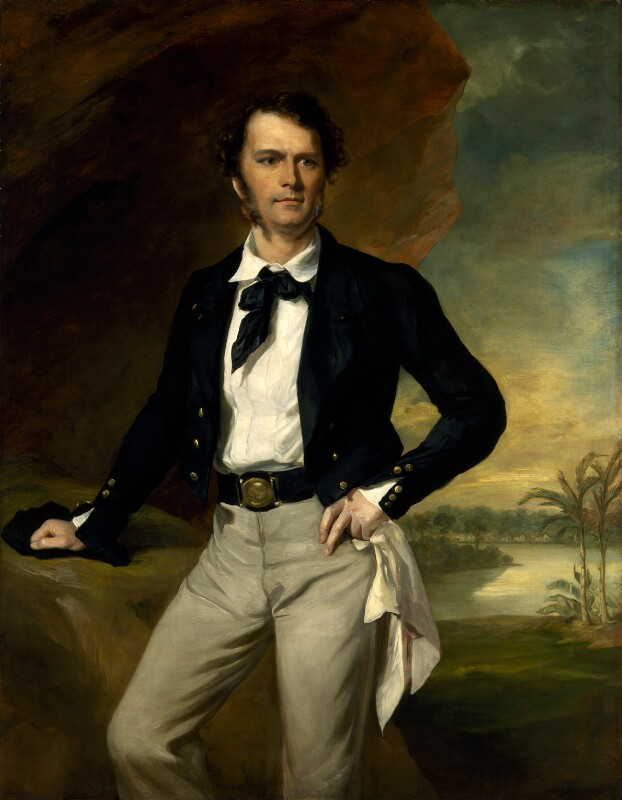
Sir James, the founder of the Raj

RYS Burgee

James Brooke, the first White Rajah sailed from England in Dec of 1838, on The Royalist, which was a ship registered with the Royal Yacht Squadron. As such, it was permitted to fly a White Ensign and a Royal Yacht Squadron burgee. Various authors have suggested that James may have used these flags to represent himself and possibly even Sarawak before 1848, but no evidence has been cited to prove this flag was ever used to represent Sarawak itself.

The Sarawak flag first hoisted 21 September 1848 as described by James Brooke in his letter to Lord Palmerston dated 14 March 1849

The first flag designed and made for Sarawak was first hoisted on 21 September 1848. Brooke held a ceremony at his house on the grounds of the Astana. During this ceremony "A new flag, which the Rajah had brought from England, was then unfurled for the first time – displaying a black and red cross on a yellow field. This was to be henceforth the national flag of Sarawak."

This flag was flown for almost six months before James sought the British Foreign Office's approval. On 14 March 1849 James wrote a letter to the British foreign secretary Lord Palmerston. James wrote "...I beg to acquaint your Lordship, that on my return to Sarawak, feeling how desirable such a measure would be, I hoisted a flag, and recommended its adoption by all native prahus and other vessels belonging to this country. I subsequently waited to ascertain before reporting to your Lordship, how far the native community was inclined to adopt the use of the flag, which is a yellow field, with a cross per pale red and black, and I am happy to add, that they have eagerly embraced this distinguishing mark of Country, which they look upon as a security to these vessels..."

In June 1849 Lord Palmerston approved the use of the Sarawak flag and forwarded James' description and depiction of the flag to the British Admiralty.

The first known record of a ship flying the Sarawak flag left Sarawak on 12 December 1851. It was the barque "Fater Sarawak" captained by Cowan and arrived in Singapore on 19 December 1851.

== Inconsistent colour descriptions ==
There has been confusion over the history of the colours of the cross on the flag because other authors have reported both purple and blue instead of black as the other half of the cross opposing the red half. For example,

1. Harriette McDougall wrote 'The Sarawak flag is a red and purple cross, out of Sir James Brooke's armorial shield, on a yellow ground, yellow being the royal colour of Borneo'
2. But McDougall also wrote 'When we were at Singapore during the winter of 1849, Papa had a pulpit and reading-desk, chairs, and a painted glass east window, made with the cross of the Sarawak flag, deep blue and red, on a yellow ground, for the centre light.'
3. And finally in a later book McDougall also wrote this: "On the 24th of July they left us, as many as eighteen Malay prahus, manned by from twenty to seventy men in each, and decorated with flags and streamers innumerable, of the brightest colours, the Sarawak flag, a red and black cross on a yellow ground, always at the stern."

Due to these inconsistent descriptions of the colour of the cross, along with other circumstantial evidence Wilfrid John Chater found in the State archives, he developed a theory that the Sarawak flag flown on 21 September 1848 bore a blue & red cross. He first published this theory in the Sarawak Gazette 30 Nov 1964 in an article titled "Flags" He concluded that since he found a document using the phrase 'change blue bunting to black' dated 6 May 1870, that Charles must have changed the colour of the flag on that date. This faulty conclusion has been re-printed in numerous sources since 1964.

W. J. Chater stated that there were no other mentions of the colour of the cross on the flag before 1870, but in fact there are several:

1. Flag witnessed in 1866 – Cuthbert Collingwood – 'flying the Rajah's flag — a broad cross, half red and half black, upon a buff ground'
2. Flag witnessed in 1863 - Frederick Boyle - '* A cross, half red, half black, on a yellow field, is the Sarawak flag'
3. Flag witnessed in 1849 – Charles Thomas Constantine Grant – 'Our Sarāwak Flag, a golden ground with a black and red cross, waved over the stern, as we passed between the houses of the Malay town'
4. Flag witnessed in 1848 the day of the flag raising - Henry Keppel - 'displaying a black and red cross on a yellow field'
5. Flag Designed by James Brooke and described and depicted in his 1849 letter to Palmerston - 'adopt the use of the flag, which is a yellow field, with a cross per pale red and black'

== History of the Sarawak Flag after the reign of James Brooke ==
Government Flag of Sarawak (~1870–1946), state flag of Sarawak (1963-1973)

By the advice of others in the early 1870s, Charles Brooke, the second White Rajah, "authorised a distinction mark in the Government flag by the introduction of the crown". The Eastern Crown is a heraldic symbol used by Royal Peers who have distinguished themselves in the East. It was first associated with the Brookes when it was incorporated into the coat of arms awarded posthumously to James' father Thomas Brooke Esq. (1760–1835) on 9 November 1848 and was permitted to be used by him and his descendants.

Merchant Flag of Sarawak ~1870

Once Charles distinguished the original flag with a crown, the original flag from 1848 that James designed, continued to be used as the Sarawak Merchant Flag on Sarawakian vessels and intended to be used for other non-government organisations, but additional variants were created for the S.P.G. Mission, the Sri Sarawak Steamship and the Borneo Company Offices and the Catholic Mission. Charles in a letter written later on describes the situation. "The mission raised a claim to have a distinction flag as they were not entitled to a crown, nor were they the mercantile, and the Mission flag from this date was established..."

Rajah's Standard: The personal flag of the Rajah introduced ~1870

Charles Brooke also created a new flag to represent the Rajah of Sarawak, called the Rajah's Standard. This flag was registered with the College of Arms in London and is described as "a yellow forked flag, charged with a cross per pale sable and gules charged with a crown and with the red lateral arm of the cross extended saltirewise to each point of the fork."

Charles Vyner Brooke the third and last White Rajah of Sarawak did not make any changes to the Sarawak flags.

== After the White Rajahs ==
Flag of the Crown Colony of Sarawak (1947–1963)

When Sarawak was ceded to the British Crown on 1 July 1946, the Sarawak Government flag was retained as a coat-of-arms granted by the College of Arms on 10 March 1947, and placed on a white disc in a Blue Ensign. The Sarawak Government flag from the 1870s saw continued use even after cession, flying side by side with the Union Flag. Upon the formation of Malaysia and subsequent independence of the state, the flag remained in use and unchanged until 1973.

Similar to the Czech flag, but inverted and 1:2 ratio. (1973–1988)

The Trisakti was adopted on the 10th anniversary of Sarawak's independence on 31 August 1973, and was first hoisted by the then Chief Minister of Sarawak, Tun Abdul Rahman Yacoob, who also designed the flag. Accompanying the new design of the flag is the new state anthem and motto, Sarawak Bahagia ("Peaceful Sarawak") and Hidup Selalu Berkhidmat ("Live to serve"). It resembled an inverted flag of Czechoslovakia (later the Czech flag).

State flag of Sarawak in current use.

On 31 August 1988, the flag was replaced again with the current version along with yet another new state anthem and motto, Ibu Pertiwiku ("My Motherland") and Bersatu, Berusaha, Berbakti ("United, Striving, Serving"). The new design was adopted on the 25th anniversary of independence of Sarawak within the Federation of Malaysia. It brought back the same colour scheme of the flag of the former kingdom, in a new form: the cross was replaced with two diagonal bars and the crown was substituted with a nine-pointed star symbolising the original nine divisions of Sarawak, in order to eliminate any overt references to Christianity and a sovereign monarchy. The colours were accorded official symbolism: yellow representing law and order, unity and stability; red representing courage for the state; and black representing natural resources. The star was also given the meaning of representing the aspirations of Sarawakians.

== Symbolism ==
=== The Raj of Sarawak flag (1870–1946) and First Sarawak state flag (1963–1973) ===
The yellow background is said to represent the Malays and the red and black lines represent the Chinese and Dayak communities. The crown symbolises the Rajah of Sarawak and its five points stand for the five territorial divisions of the time.

Today, these flags are still used by two separatist parties, Parti Bumi Kenyalang (PBK) and Parti Aspirasi Rakyat Sarawak (ASPIRASI, formerly State Reformation Party; STAR) as a banner for pre-Malaysia Sarawak nationalism, among other items they used during elections.

=== The "Trisakti" flag (1973–1988) ===
On the Trisakti flag, the blue triangle represents unity among the people of Sarawak, red represents courage and perseverance, and white represents honesty and purity.

=== The current Sarawak state flag (1988–present) ===
The nine-pointed star serves to represent the then nine divisions in the state, whilst the colour yellow denotes the importance of upholding the law, unity and stability in diversity.

The red portrays courage and black is the symbol of the abundant natural resources that Sarawak possesses.

== Historical Sarawakian flags ==
The Sarawak flag first hoisted 21 September 1848 as described by James Brooke in his letter to Lord Palmerston dated 14 March 1849. Became the Raj's merchant flag in 1870 and only used on non-government vessels.

Government Flag: Used to represent the Sarawak Government from (~1870–1946)

Rajah's Standard: The personal flag of the Rajah introduced ~1870

Flag of the governor of Sarawak (Used after 10 March 1947 – 1963)

Flag of the Crown Colony of Sarawak. (Introduced after 10 March 1947 – 1963, but not widely used)

Civil ensign of the Crown Colony of Sarawak. (Introduced after 10 March 1947 – 1963, but not widely used)

Flag of the state of Sarawak (1963–1973), based on the government flag of the Raj of Sarawak, with defined ratio of 1:2.

The flag of "Trisakti". Similar to the Czech flag, but inverted and 1:2 ratio. (1973–1988)

State flag of Sarawak in current use.

== City, district and municipal flags ==
Sarawak does not assign flags for its cities, districts and municipal areas. However, some local government authorities in the state have adopted their own flags.
