= Celestial crown =

Heraldic crown

Example of a celestial crown

The celestial crown is a modified version of the Eastern crown. The celestial crown is a representative badge or headdress consisting of a gold fence usually adorned with pointed points or rays topped with stars of the same metal. It usually has eight points, five in the representations that are not in relief, although the number of these is variable.

The celestial crown appears in some Catholic representations of the Virgin Mary and is also used in heraldry.

The celestial crown has longer spikes than the Eastern crown.

== Gallery ==
Arms of the Roman Catholic Diocese of Palm Beach

Former arms of St Stephen's House (University of Oxford)

Arms of Campion Hall (University of Oxford)

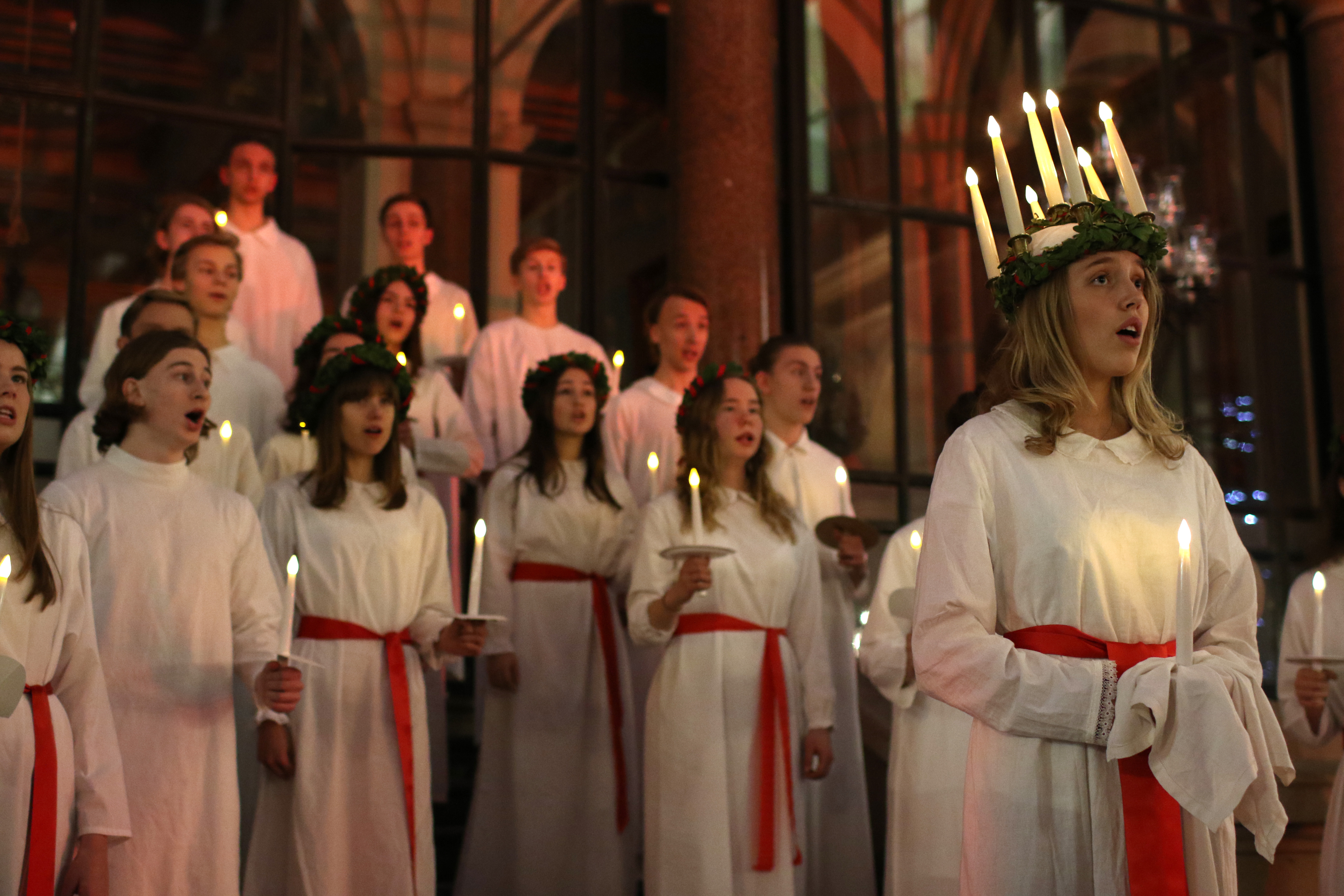
Saint Lucy's Day

== See also ==
- Crown (heraldry)
- Heraldry
- Circlet
- Golden hat
- Crown of Immortality
- Circle of stars
- Astral crown
