= Volkskrone =

Crown used in German civic heraldry after 1919

The Volkskrone (English: People's Crown) is an heraldic crown introduced in Germany after World War I. When the German monarchies were abolished following the defeat in the war, this was created as a "republican" crown to replace the old crowns and coronets of rank in the arms of the German Länder, the states of the German federal republic. As designed by the German heraldic authority Otto Hupp in 1919, the crown, also known as a Laubkrone (leaf crown), consists of five vine leaves on a jewelled rim. During the Weimar Republic all of the German states adopted versions of the Volkskrone. After World War II only Baden-Württemberg, Bavaria, Hesse and Rhineland-Palatinate chose to retain its use, while Berlin combined it with a mural crown.

Lesser coat of arms of Baden-Württemberg with a local adaptation of the Volkskrone

Lesser coat of arms of Bavaria with a Volkskrone

Coat of arms of Berlin with a hybrid crown combining elements of both a Volkskrone and a mural crown

Coat of arms of Hesse with a Volkskrone

Coat of arms of Rhineland-Palatinate with a Volkskrone

== See also ==
- Media related to Volkskrone at Wikimedia Commons
