= Zolochiv Castle =

Coordinates: 49°48′08″N 24°54′22″E

- Zolochiv, Lviv Oblast, Ukraine
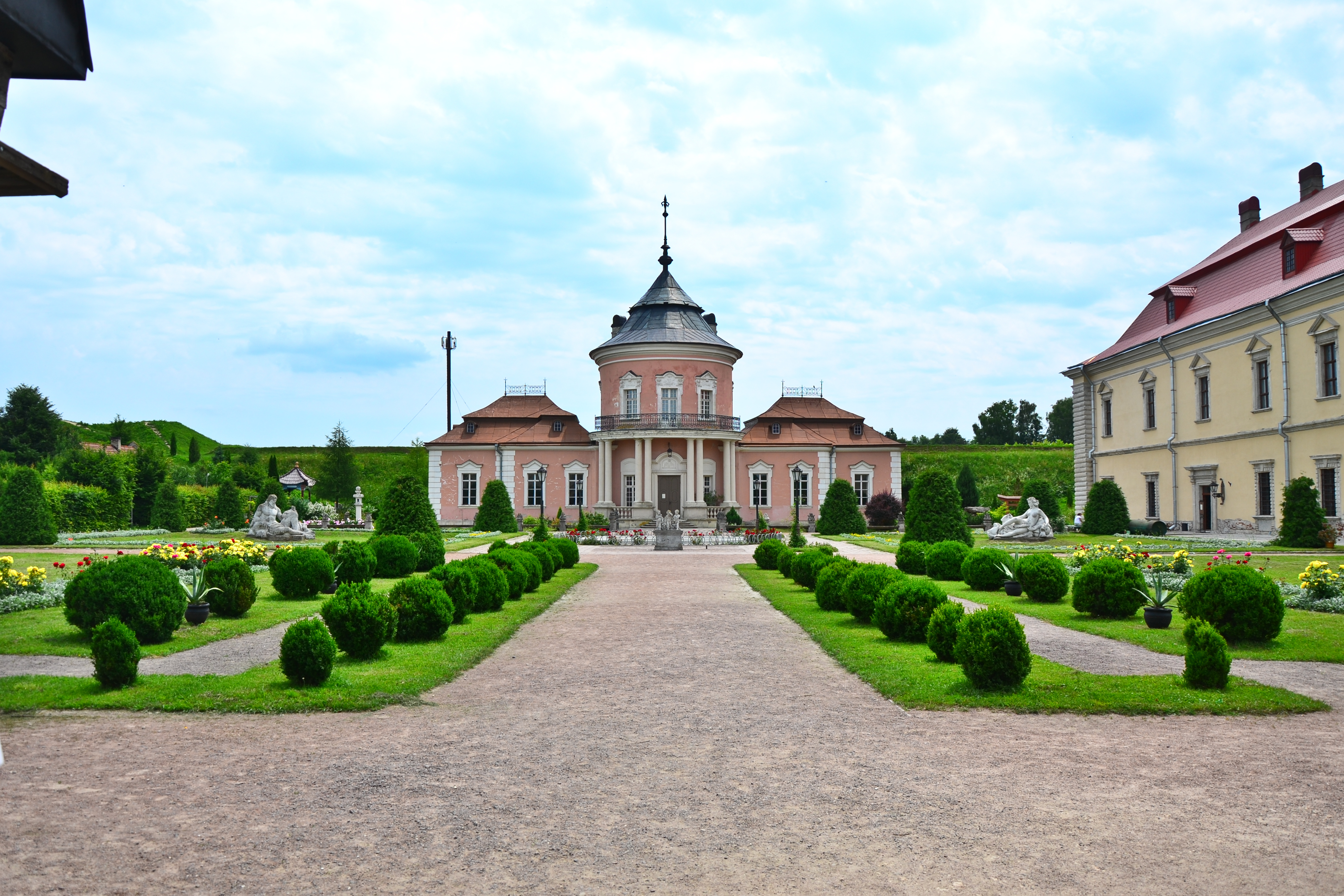
- Chinese Palace (on the left) and Grand Palace (on the right).

Site information
- Type: Castle
- Condition: Survives in good condition.

Site history
- Built: 15th century

Immovable Monument of National Significance of Ukraine
- Official name: Замок (Castle)
- Type: Architecture
- Reference no.: 130058

The Zolochiv Castle (Ukrainian: Золочівський замок, romanized: Zolochivs'kyi zamok) was a residence of the Sobieski noble family on a hill at the confluence of two small rivers in the south-eastern part of Zolochiv (Polish: Złoczów), Galicia (now part of Ukraine's Lviv Oblast).

The rectangular fort was built in 1634–36 by Jakub Sobieski using the labor of enslaved Crimean Tatars. The Sobieski castle comprised solid walls in a then-current Dutch style, with four pentagonal towers at each corner, and the so-called "grand palace". The Chinese Palace, a diminutive mauve-colored rotunda flanked by one-storey wings, was added later in the century as a gift from King John III Sobieski to his French-born wife, Queen Marie.

In 1672, the castle was taken after a 6-days siege by the Turks under Kapudan Pasa. Three years later, it survived a new siege by the Ottoman army. After Jakub Ludwik Sobieski's death in 1737, the castle passed to the Radziwiłł princely family and then (in 1801) to Count Łukasz Komarnicki-Pawlikowicz (of the House of Sas), whose heirs sold it to the Austrian crown in 1834.

In the 19th century, the castle was adapted for use as a hospital and barracks. It was turned into a prison in 1872 and continued in use after the September Campaign. A chapel commemorating the victims of the NKVD is located on the grounds of the castle.

Thousands of people belonging to the Jewish faith were taken from Zolochiv and were killed by the Germans at the outbreak of Operation Barbarossa.

Since 1985, the complex has been supervised by the Lviv Art Gallery and under restoration. Recently it began to open its grounds for visitors. Exhibits include more than 25 European coats of arms, dinosaur bone chandeliers, and a replica of a typical royal crown from the 13th century that could be similar to that of Daniel of Galicia.

== See also ==
- List of Baroque residences
