= Crown of Rus =

Coronation crown of Daniel of Galicia

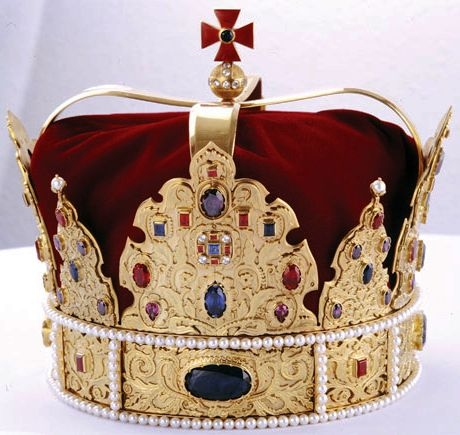
- Modern replica of the Crown of Rus

Details
- Country: Ukraine
- Made: Between 1246 and 1253
- Destroyed: Between 1340 and 1349
- Weight: 3-3,5 kg
- Arches: 4
- Material: Gold
- Cap: Red velvet
- Notable stones: Pearls, gemstones

The Crown of Rus (Ukrainian: Руська корона, romanized: Rus’ka korona), also known as the Crown of Kingdom of Galicia–Volhynia, was the crown with which Daniel of Galicia was crowned in 1253 by a papal archbishop in Drohiczyn (Dorohochyn). The coronation of Daniel took place around the same time as Mindaugas.

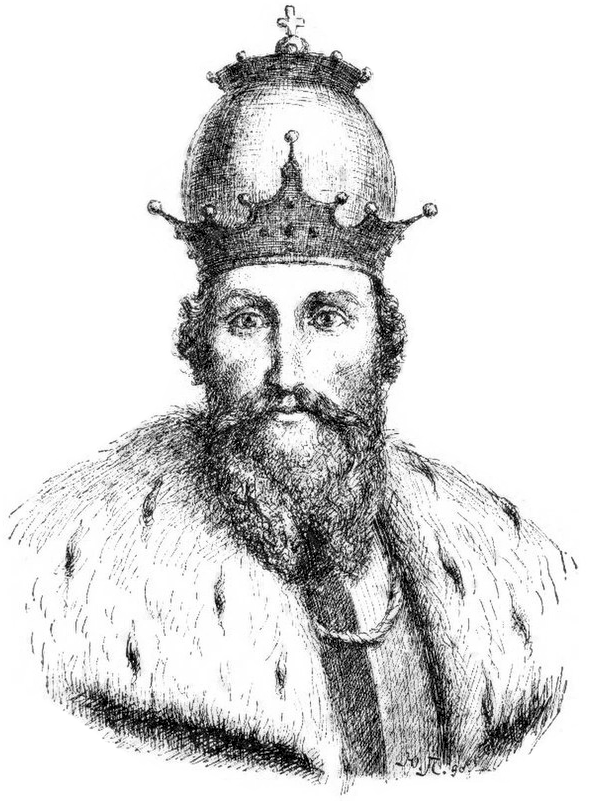
King Daniel, drawing from 1904

== History ==
The crowning of Daniel of Galicia is a debated topic, most historians landing around the year 1253, but the specific date is not known. Historian Mykhailo Hrushevsky wrote that the coronation took place in 1252, Vladimir Pashuto considered the date to be around 1254, and Mykola Kotlyar gives the year 1253. Daniel took crown from the hands of Opizzo Fieschi, a papal legate and nephew of Pope Innocent IV. It is believed that the crown was made in Western Europe, either in Italy or in France.

The crown is believed to have been lost. However, there are many speculations on where it might be located, including Poland, the Vatican, the United States, and Russia. Polish historian Eugeniusz Misiło believes that the crown was converted into a miter for Ukrainian Greek Catholic Church bishops in Przemyśl and searches for it in Polish monasteries.

== Replica ==
After Ukrainian independence in 1991, work began on a replica, based on the drawings and historical data by the jewelers from Kyiv and Western Ukraine. The crown was finished in the 2000s and now part of a permanent exhibit of the Zolochiv Castle in Western Ukraine.

== Gallery ==
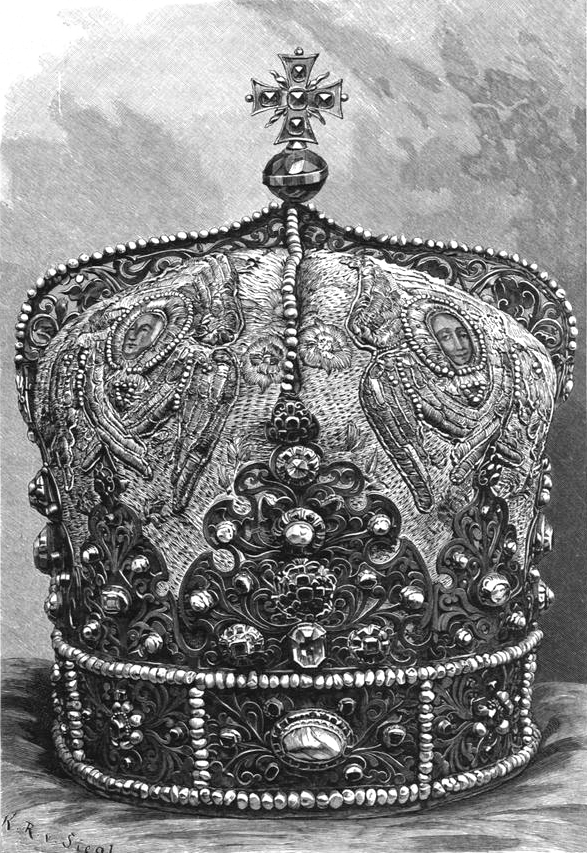
Mitre of bishops of Przemyśl (1898)

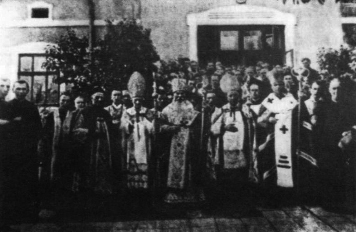
Josaphat Koncilowski with the Mitre of bishops of Przemyśl at celebration of the coronation of the icon of Theotokos of Sambor

== See also ==
- Daniel of Galicia
- Mindaugas
- Kingdom of Galicia–Volhynia
- Zolochiv Castle
