= Eastern crown =

Heraldic crown in the form of a circlet with sharp tines

Example of an Eastern crown

The Eastern Crown is a gold heraldic crown surmounted with a variable number of sharp spikes. The Eastern Crown is one of the oldest crowns, and so for this reason it has also been known as the Antique Crown.

The celestial crown is a modified Eastern Crown with longer spikes and topped by stars with no specific fixed number of points.

== Gallery ==
Example of an Eastern crown (Hugo Gerard Ströhl)

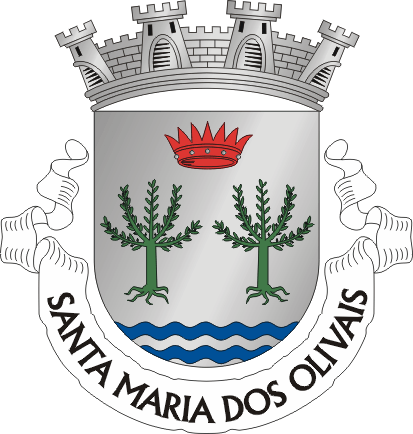
Coat of arms of Santa Maria dos Olivais, Lisbon (Portugal) featuring an Eastern crown gules as a charge

Coat of arms of the former Kingdom of Illyria featuring an Eastern crown

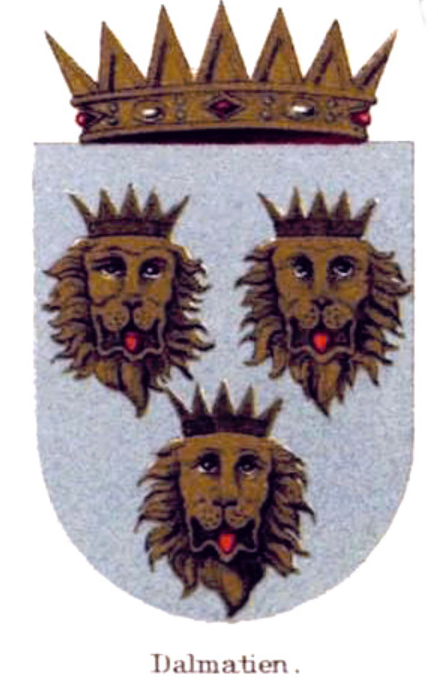
Old coat of arms of Dalmatia (Habsburg Monarchy) featuring Eastern crowns

Coat of arms of the Order of Saint Lazarus featuring an Eastern crown

Coat of arms of the Duke of Wellington featuring supporters gorged (collared) of Eastern crowns

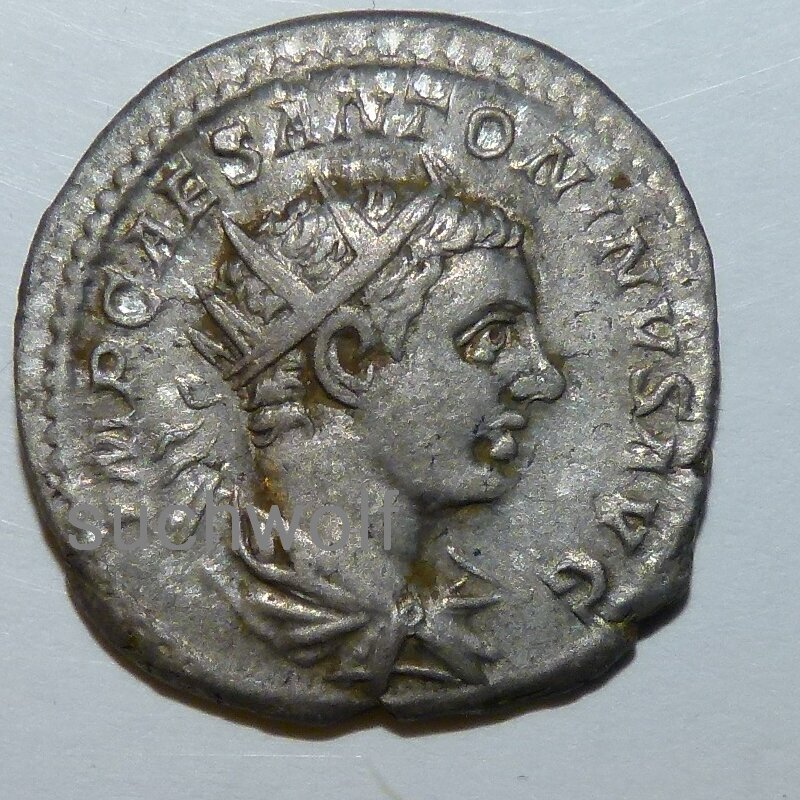
An eastern crown depicted on a coin of Marcus Aurelius

== See also ==
- Radiant crown
- Crown (heraldry)
- Celestial crown
- Heraldry
- Circlet
- Golden hat
