= Astral crown =

Heraldic crown made up of wings and stars

An astral crown

The astral crown is a gold crown surmounted with eight low points. The centrals and laterals points are topped with a star, with an unspecified number of points, between two wings.

In heraldry, an astral crown is mounted atop the shields of coats of arms of units belonging to some air forces or the personal arms of its distinguished commanders.

Its creation became necessary after the founding of the Royal Air Force in the UK, because there was no Roman military award device for aerial warfare equivalent to the naval crown for navies and the camp crown for armies.

Some air forces in other countries have adopted variants of the astral crown.

== Gallery ==
An astral crown in the coat of arms of the Chilean Air Force

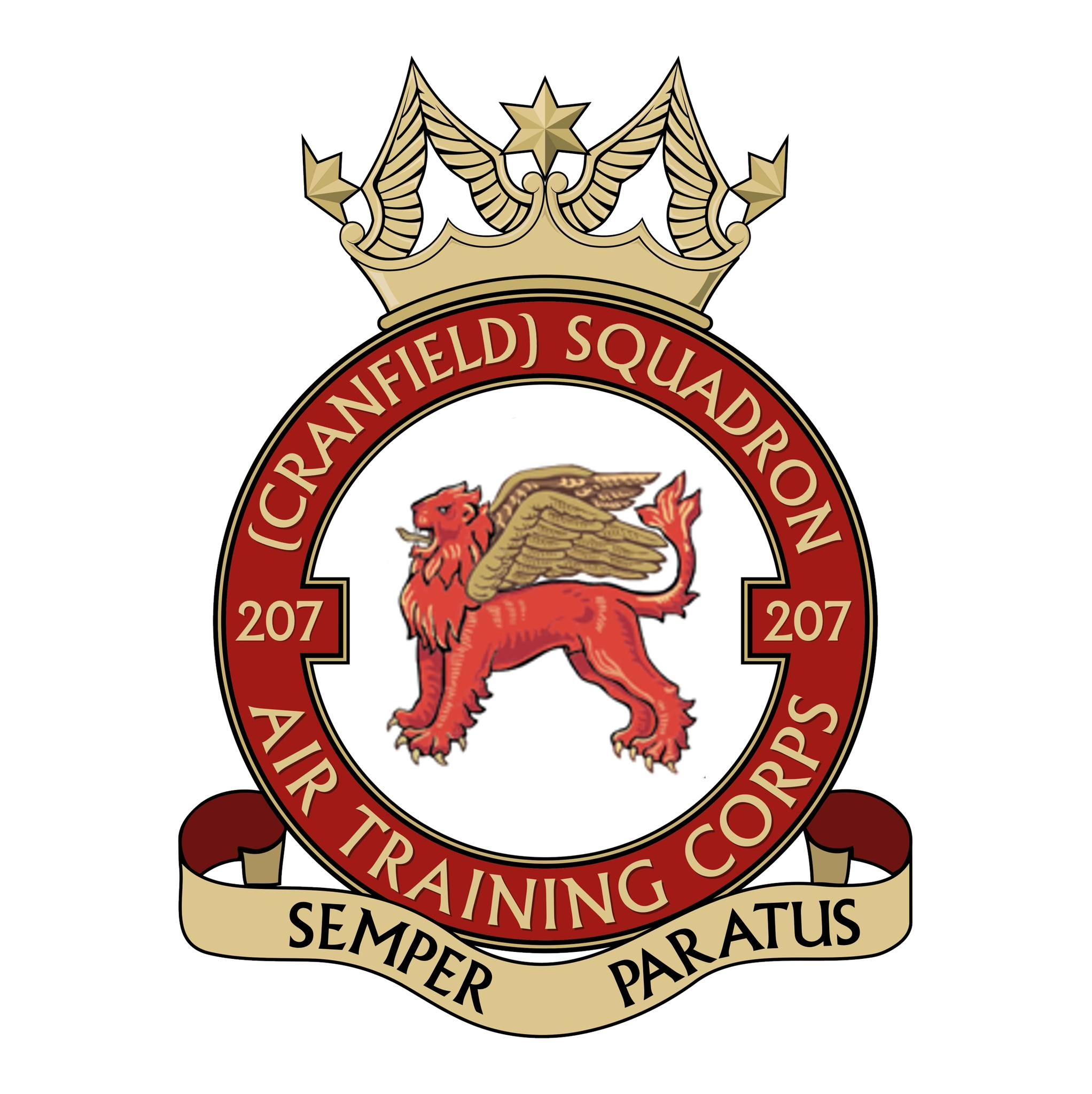
Astral crown in the crest of No. 207 (Cranfield) Squadron Air Training Corps

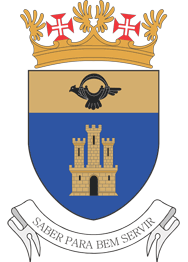
The Portuguese Air Force variant of the astral crown in the coat of arms of the Sintra Air Base

An astral crown in the coat of arms of British Airways

An astral crown in crest in the coat of arms of Cranfield University

== See also ==
- Crown (heraldry)
- Camp crown
- Celestial crown
- Mural crown
- Naval crown
- Heraldry
- Military aviation
