= Armorial of the United States =

The coats of arms of the U.S. states are coats of arms, that are an official symbol of the state, alongside their seal. Eighteen states have officially adopted coats of arms. The former independent Republic of Texas and Kingdom of Hawaii each had a separate national coat of arms, which are no longer used.

Heraldic arms were worn (embroidered) on a coat which knights wore over their armor, hence coat of arms, a term which dates back roughly 1,000 years to jousting tournaments. A state coat of arms may exist independently of the seal, but the reverse is not generally the case. A seal contains a coat of arms or other devices whereas a state coat of arms constitutes the bulk of a seal, except for the wording identifying it as the "Great Seal of the State of..." A "seal" has been described as the design impressed on public or legislative official documents, whereas a coat of arms generally appears for illustrative purposes. Examples include flags and banners, and state militia uniform caps and buttons, as well as specifically-designed regimental coats of arms for U.S. Infantry Regiments, and National Guard units.

A coat of arms of a nation or state is usually the design or device of the obverse of its seal. It is an official emblem, mark of identification, and symbol of the authority of the government of a nation or state. A nation or state's coat of arms is oftentimes referred to as the national or state arms.

— Office of the Secretary of State of Texas, 2010

== Federal ==

=== President ===
Many United States presidents have borne a coat of arms; largely through inheritance, assumption, or grants from foreign heraldic authorities: President Dwight D. Eisenhower receiving his in Denmark upon becoming a Knight of the Order of the Elephant.

The President of the United States, as a position, uses the presidential seal as a coat of arms, but this is a coat of arms of office, not a personal coat of arms.

=== Vice president ===
Several United States vice presidents have borne a coat of arms; largely through inheritance, assumption, or grants from foreign heraldic authorities. The vice president of the United States, as a position, uses the vice presidential seal as a coat of arms, though this is a coat of arms of office, not a personal coat of arms.

=== Military ===
Coats of arms of US Army units are heraldic emblems associated with units in the US Army. Under Army Regulation 840-10, each regiment and separate table of organization and equipment (TOE) battalion of the US Army is authorized a coat of arms to be displayed on the organization's flag, called the "colors." This coat of arms usually forms the basis for the unit's distinctive unit insignia (DUI), the emblem worn by all members of the unit on their service uniforms.

== States ==
=== Heraldic coats of arms ===
State	Arms	Adoption	Blazon	Article
Alabama		Coat of arms of the state of Alabama, adopted March 14, 1939 Statehood – 14 December 1819; Arms – 29 December 1868	Quarterly, the first Azure three fleurs-de-lis Or; the second quarterly first and fourth Gules a triple-towered castle Or masoned Sable and ajoure the first [viz., Azure], second and third Argent a lion rampant the third [viz., Gules] crowned, langued and armed the second [viz., Or]; third the first [viz., Azure], the crosses-saltires of St. Andrew and St. Patrick quartered per saltire counter changed argent and the third [viz., Gules]; the latter fimbriated of the second, surmounted by the cross of St. George of the third, fimbriated as the saltire; fourth the third [viz., Gules] a saltire the first [viz., Azure] fimbrated the fifth [viz., Argent], in saltire ten stars the fifth; overall an escutcheon of the third [viz., Gules] six pellets the fifth [viz., Argent] under a chief of the first [viz., Azure].	Coat of arms of Alabama (Wikimedia Commons category)
Connecticut	Connecticut state coat of arms	Statehood – 9 January 1788; Arms – October 1842 Arms of the state of Connecticut, adopted March 24, 1931	On a shield of rococo design: Argent three grape vines Proper supported and fructed.	Coat of arms of Connecticut (Wikimedia Commons category)
Delaware		Statehood – 7 December 1787; Arms – 18 January 1847 Coat of arms of the state of Delaware, adopted in 1777		Coat of arms of Delaware (Wikimedia Commons category)
Hawaii		Coat of arms of the state of Hawaii		Coat of arms of Hawaii (Wikimedia Commons category)
Louisiana	Louisiana state coat of arms	Statehood – 30 April 1812; Arms – 23 December 1813 (Note: The illustrated Louisiana coat of arms represents a small design change in 1864, but the concept and design elements were in place since 1813.) (Note: The Louisiana coat of arms on the back of the 1882BB was engraved by Louis Delnoce of the Bureau of Engraving and Printing.)		Coat of arms of Louisiana (Wikimedia Commons category)
Maryland		Statehood – 28 April 1788; Arms – 18 March 1876 (Note: The illustrated coat of arms of Maryland was the tenth version of the seal, and a restoration to the description offered by Lord Baltimore on 12 August 1648).) (Note: The Maryland coat of arms on the back of the 1882BB was engraved by W.W. Rice of the Bureau of Engraving and Printing.)	Quarterly first and fourth, a paly of six Or and Sable, a bend counterchanged; quarterly second and third, quarterly Argent and Gules a cross bottony counterchanged. Above the shield an earl's coronet surmounted by a barred helm affronté Argent.	Coat of arms of Maryland (Wikimedia Commons category)
Massachusetts		Statehood – 6 February 1788; Arms – 13 December 1780 Coat of arms of the commonwealth of Massachusetts, adopted in 1775 (by Legislature, re-affirmed by Governor Hancock and Cabinet on December 13, 1780)	Azure an Indian thereon dressed in a shirt and moccasins in his right hand a bow and in his left an arrow point downward Or, in chief dexter shield having a blue field or surface with an Indian thereon, dressed in a shirt and moccasins, holding in his right hand a bow, and in his left hand an arrow, point downward, all of gold; and, in the upper corner of the field, above his right arm, a silver star with five points. The crest is a wreath of blue and gold, on which in gold is a right arm, bent at the elbow, clothed and ruffled, with the hand grasping a broadsword.	Coat of arms of Massachusetts (Wikimedia Commons category)
Mississippi	Mississippi state coat of arms	Statehood – 10 December 1817; Arms – 6 February 1894 (Note: In 1861 Mississippi adopted a coat of arms and state flag. However, in 1865 the approval was rescinded leaving Mississippi without official state arms until 1894. On 6 February 1894 the proposed design for the state coat of arms was approved.) Arms of the state of Mississippi, adopted February 7, 2001		Coat of arms of Mississippi (Wikimedia Commons category)
Missouri	Missouri state coat of arms	Statehood – 10 August 1821; Arms – 11 January 1822 (Note: The Missouri seal and arms were designed by Judge Robert William Wells.) Coat of arms of the state of Missouri		Coat of arms of Missouri (Wikimedia Commons category)
New Jersey		Statehood – 18 December 1787; Arms – 10 September 1776 (Note: New Jersey coat of arms was designed by Pierre Eugene Du Simitiere.) Coat of arms of the state of New Jersey	Azure, three ploughs Proper; supporters, Liberty and Ceres. The Goddess Liberty to carry in her dexter hand a pole, proper, surmounted by a cap gules, with band azure at the bottom, displaying on the band six stars, argent; tresses falling on shoulders, proper; head bearing over all a chaplet of laurel leaves, vert; overdress, tenne; underskirt, argent; feet sandaled, standing on scroll. Ceres: Same as Liberty, save overdress, gules; holding in left hand a cornucopia, or, bearing apples, plums and grapes surrounded by leaves, all proper; head bearing over all a chaplet of wheat spears, vert. Shield surmounted by sovereign's helmet, six bars, or; wreath and mantling, argent and azure. Crest: A horse's head, proper. Underneath the shield and supporting the goddesses, a scroll azure, bordered with tenne, in three waves or folds; on the upper folds the words "Liberty and Prosperity"; on the under fold in Arabic numerals, the figures "1776"	Coat of arms of New Jersey (Wikimedia Commons category)
North Dakota		Coat of arms of the state of North Dakota, adopted in 1957	Device: On an Indian arrowhead point to base Or a bend vert charged with three mullets of the first, in base a fleur-de-lis of the second. Crest: On a wreath Or and azure, a sheaf of three arrows argent armed and flighted gules behind a stringed bow fessways Or with grip of the second (gules). Motto: Strength from the soil.	Coat of arms of North Dakota (Wikimedia Commons category)
Pennsylvania		Statehood – 12 December 1787; Arms – 17 March 1875 Coat of arms of the commonwealth of Pennsylvania, adopted 1778	Tierced per fess azure, Or, and vert; in chief a ship at sea proper; in fess a plough proper; in base three sheaves of wheat proper	Coat of arms of Pennsylvania (Wikimedia Commons category)
Rhode Island		Statehood – 29 May 1790; Arms – 24 February 1875 (Note: The Rhode Island state coat of arms on the back of the 1882BB was engraved by Timothy House of the Bureau of Engraving and Printing.) Arms of the state of Rhode Island, adopted 1 February 1882		Coat of arms of Rhode Island (Wikimedia Commons category)
Texas		Statehood – 29 December 1845; Arms – 25 January 1839 Arms of the state of Texas		Coat of arms of Texas (Wikimedia Commons category)
Virginia		Statehood – 25 June 1788; Arms – 20 October 1619 (re-adopted 3 June 1976)		Coat of arms of Virginia (Wikimedia Commons category)

=== Non-heraldic shields and seals ===
State	Arms	Blazon	Article
Alaska		Statehood – 3 January 1959; Arms – 3 January 1959	Seal of Alaska (Wikimedia Commons category)
Arizona			Coat of arms of Arizona (Wikimedia Commons category)
Arkansas	Arkansas state coat of arms from the reverse of the National Bank Note Series 1882BB	Statehood – 15 June 1836; Arms – 3 May 1864	Coat of arms of Arkansas (Wikimedia Commons category)
California		Statehood – 9 September 1850; Arms – 2 October 1849	Coat of arms of California (Wikimedia Commons category)
Colorado	Coat of Arms of the State of Colorado	Statehood – August 1, 1876; Arms – March 15, 1877; CRS 24-80-901	Coat of Arms of the State of Colorado (Wikimedia Commons category)
Florida	Florida state coat of arms	Statehood – 3 March 1845; Arms – 6 August 1868	Coat of arms of Florida (Wikimedia Commons category)
Georgia	Georgia state coat of arms	Statehood – 2 January 1788; Arms – 8 February 1799	Coat of arms of Georgia (U.S. state) (Wikimedia Commons category)
Idaho	Idaho territory coat of arms	Organic Act – 3 March 1863; Arms – 13 March 1866; Statehood – 3 July 1890	Coat of arms of Idaho (Wikimedia Commons category)
Illinois	Illinois state coat of arms from the reverse of the National Bank Note Series 1882BB	Statehood – 3 December 1818; Arms – 7 March 1867	Coat of arms of Illinois (Wikimedia Commons category)
Indiana	Indiana state coat of arms	Statehood – 11 December 1816; Arms – 13 December 1816	Coat of arms of Indiana (Wikimedia Commons category)
Iowa	Iowa state coat of arms	Statehood – 28 December 1846; Arms – 25 February 1847	Coat of arms of Iowa (Wikimedia Commons category)
Kansas	Kansas state coat of arms	Statehood – 29 January 1861; Arms – 25 May 1861 (Note: The Kansas state coat of arms on the back of the 1882BB was engraved by Timothy House of the Bureau of Engraving and Printing.)	Coat of arms of Kansas (Wikimedia Commons category)
Kentucky	Kentucky state coat of arms	Statehood – 1 June 1792; Arms – 20 December 1792 (Note: The Kentucky coat of arms on the back of the 1882BB was engraved by Alfred Jones of the Bureau of Engraving and Printing.)	Coat of arms of Kentucky (Wikimedia Commons category)
Maine		Statehood – 15 March 1820; Arms – 9 June 1820 Coat of arms of the state of Maine, adopted June 9, 1820	Coat of arms of Maine (Wikimedia Commons category)
Michigan		Statehood – 26 January 1837; Arms – 2 June 1835 Coat of arms of the state of Michigan, adopted 1835, modified 1911	Coat of arms of Michigan (Wikimedia Commons category)
Minnesota	Minnesota state coat of arms	Statehood – 11 May 1858; Arms – 16 July 1858	Coat of arms of Minnesota (Wikimedia Commons category)
Montana	Montana territory coat of arms	Organic Act – 26 May 1864; Arms – 9 February 1865 (Note: According to the State Constitution of Montana, in the event of a transition from a Territorial to State government, the Territorial Seal would remain effective until expressly changed by legislative action.); Statehood – 8 November 1889	Coat of arms of Montana (Wikimedia Commons category)
Nebraska	Nebraska state coat of arms	Statehood – 1 March 1867; Arms – 15 June 1867 (Note: The illustrated arms represent the change from the territorial to state arms. However, the BEP engraved arms were never updated.)	Coat of arms of Nebraska (Wikimedia Commons category)
Nevada	Nevada state coat of arms	Statehood – 31 October 1864; Arms – 24 February 1866	Coat of arms of Nevada (Wikimedia Commons category)
New Hampshire	New Hampshire state coat of arms	Statehood – 21 June 1788; Arms – 12 February 1785	Coat of arms of New Hampshire (Wikimedia Commons category)
New Mexico	New Mexico territory coat of arms	Organic Act – 9 September 1850; Arms – 1 February 1887; Statehood – 6 January 1912	Coat of arms of New Mexico (Wikimedia Commons category)
New York		Statehood – 26 July 1788; Arms – 27 March 1809 Coat of arms of the state of New York	Coat of arms of New York (Wikimedia Commons category)
North Carolina	North Carolina state coat of arms	Statehood – 21 November 1789; Arms – 1835	Coat of arms of North Carolina (Wikimedia Commons category)
Ohio	Ohio state coat of arms	Statehood – 1 March 1803; Arms – 1 March 1803 (Note: While the seal of Ohio had experienced several unauthorized varieties in use, in 1868 legislature reverted the official design to the initial seal from the state constitution of 1803.) Arms of the state of Ohio, adopted 1953, modified 1996	Coat of arms of Ohio (Wikimedia Commons category)
Oklahoma	Great Seal of Oklahoma	Statehood – 16 November 1907; Seal – 1905 (Oklahoma has no arms, only a great seal)	Seal of Oklahoma
Oregon	Oregon state coat of arms	Statehood – 14 February 1859; Arms – 2 June 1859	Coat of arms of Oregon (Wikimedia Commons category)
South Carolina	South Carolina state coat of arms	Statehood – 23 May 1788; Arms – 2 April 1776	Coat of arms of South Carolina (Wikimedia Commons category)
South Dakota	South Dakota state coat of arms from the reverse of the National Bank Note Series 1882BB	Statehood – 2 November 1889; Arms – 1 October 1889	Coat of arms of South Dakota (Wikimedia Commons category)
Tennessee	Tennessee state coat of arms	Statehood – 1 June 1796; Arms – 24 April 1802 (Note: The Tennessee state coat of arms on the back of the 1882BB was engraved by Timothy House of the Bureau of Engraving and Printing.)	Coat of arms of Tennessee (Wikimedia Commons category)
Utah	Utah territory coat of arms	Organic Act – 9 September 1850; Arms – 9 September 1850; Statehood – 4 January 1896 Coat of arms of the state of Utah	Coat of arms of Utah (Wikimedia Commons category)
Vermont		Statehood – 4 March 1791; Arms – 20 February 1779 (Note: On 25 November 1862, Vermont legislature formally recognized the existing seal and coat of arms.) Coat of arms of the state of Vermont, adopted 1862 (by Act No. 11)	Coat of arms of Vermont (Wikimedia Commons category)
Virginia	Virginia state coat of arms	Statehood – 25 June 1788; Arms – 1776 (Note: The coat of arms was engraved in Paris and not ready until 4 September 1779.) (Note: The Virginia coat of arms on the back of the 1882BB was engraved by James Bannister of the Bureau of Engraving and Printing.)	Coat of arms of Virginia (Wikimedia Commons category)
Washington	Washington state coat of arms the reverse of the National Bank Note Series 1882BB	Organic Act – 2 March 1853; Arms – 28 February 1854	Coat of arms of Washington (Wikimedia Commons category)
West Virginia		Statehood – 20 June 1863; Arms – 26 September 1863 (Note: Drawings by Joseph H. Diss Debar.) Arms of the state of West Virginia, adopted September 26, 1863	Coat of arms of West Virginia (Wikimedia Commons category)
Wisconsin		Statehood – 29 May 1848; Arms – 29 December 1851 Coat of arms of the state of Wisconsin	Coat of arms of Wisconsin (Wikimedia Commons category)
Wyoming	Wyoming territory coat of arms	Organic Act – 25 July 1868; Statehood – 10 July 1890	Coat of arms of Wyoming (Wikimedia Commons category)

=== Origin and history ===
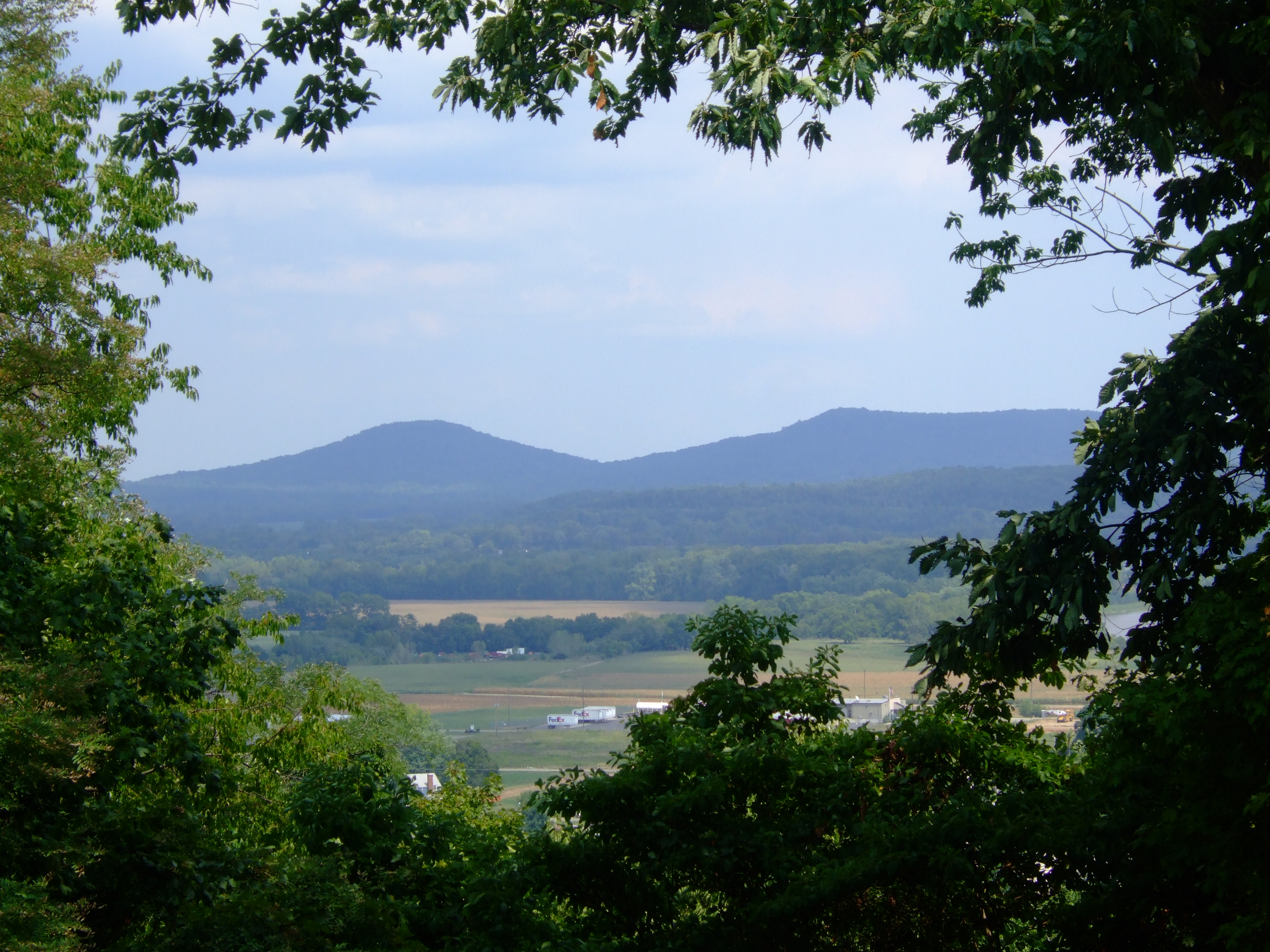
Ohio's seal depicts Mount Logan (elevation 1,243 ft (379 m)) and nearby summits in Chillicothe.

The coats of arms of the U.S. states date back to the admission of the first states to the Union. Despite the widely accepted practice of determining early statehood from the date of ratification of the United States Constitution, many of the original colonies referred to themselves as states shortly after the Declaration of Independence was signed on 4 July 1776. Committees of political leaders and intellectuals were established by state legislatures to research and propose a seal and coat of arms. Many of these members were signers of the Articles of Confederation, Declaration of Independence, and United States Constitution. Several of the earliest adopted state coats of arms and seals were similar or identical to their colonial counterparts.

State Arms of the Union, illustrated by Henry Mitchell and published by Louis Prang (known as the father of the lithographic industry), offers historically accurate renderings of the state's coats of arms as they existed in 1876. An accomplished engraver with the Bureau of Engraving and Printing for 40 years, Mitchell was responsible for engraving several coats of arms for official state use as well as arms for well-known educational and philanthropic organizations. The illustrations are presented alongside proof impressions from the engraved dies used to print the state arms on the first issue of United States National Bank Notes.

Published in 1876 by Louis Prang and illustrated by Henry Mitchell, State Arms of the Union contains a chromolithographed title page depicting the Great Seal of the United States and seven color plates with 45 state and territorial coats of arms. The book was likely published for the Philadelphia Centennial Exposition.

Louis Prang was born 12 March 1824 in Breslau. At the age of 13 he began apprenticing for his father and learned to dye and print calico, as well as wood and metal engraving. Prang emigrated to Boston in 1850 and became an illustrator for a number of local publications. Starting a business partnership in 1856 to manufacture copper and lithographic plates, Prang became sole proprietor in 1860 and named the company L. Prang & Co. He specialized in color printing, more specifically "chromolithography" Prang spent over four decades studying and creating a standard of colors and engraved and printed maps, prints of contemporary celebrities, and color reproductions of famous works of art. In 1875 Prang was responsible for introducing the Christmas card to America. He created an annual design competition for his Christmas cards (run between 1880 and 1884), and judges included John La Farge, Samuel Colman, Stanford White, and Louis Comfort Tiffany. Some of the notable winners included Elihu Vedder, Rosina Emmet Sherwood, Edwin Blashfield, Thomas Moran, and Will Hicok Low. Prang has become known as the "father of the American Christmas card", as well as the "father of the lithographic industry".

Henry Mitchell was born in New York in 1835 and went to school in Philadelphia. At the age of 10 he began working with his uncle to learn the trade of gem and steel engraving. By the age of 20 (1855), Mitchell had engraved the official seals for the Kingdom of Hawaii. In 1868 Mitchell joined the Bureau of Engraving and Printing and for 40 years engraved stamped envelopes. Through his BEP work, Mitchell was also responsible for engraving the seal of the Secretary of the Navy and the Internal Revenue Service. He also engraved the state seals for Massachusetts, New York, New Hampshire, Vermont, Rhode Island, and Wisconsin. Outside of state and federal government engraving, Mitchell engraved the seals and coats of arms for many well-known institutions which include Harvard University, Society of the Cincinnati, and Boston Public Library. He engraved the Philadelphia Centennial Exhibition award medal (1876) which was struck in the Philadelphia Mint. In 1891, Mitchell was invited by the Secretary of the Treasury to join a committee to evaluate the artistic design proposals for a new issue of U.S. coins. The two other members were Charles E. Barber, Chief Engraver of the United States Mint, and Augustus Saint-Gaudens.

In addition to being considered an expert on heraldry, Mitchell was regarded as one of the best engravers and medal designers in the United States.

A state coat of arms provided an opportunity to convey the natural and industrial resources available to its residents. Common themes depicted in state arms include farming, industry, transportation (e.g., boats, trains, and wagons), and nature (e.g., sunsets and mountains). The Ohio and Indiana state arms depict fairly substantial mountains in the distance. In reality, the highest points in Ohio and Indiana are Campbell Hill (1,550 feet (470 m)) and Hoosier Hill (1,257 feet (383 m)) respectively.

When State Arms of the Union was published in 1876, some existing arms were not included (e.g., Arizona and Washington Territory). At the time, Alaska was classified as the Department of Alaska (1867–84) and became the District of Alaska (1884–1912) before becoming the Territory of Alaska (1912–59). The Alaska territorial seal was designed in 1910 and adopted in 1913. On 3 January 1959 Alaska became the 49th U.S. State. The Oklahoma Territory (1890–1907) Organic Act was approved on 2 May 1890, and a territorial seal was adopted on 10 January 1893. Hawaii, formerly the Kingdom of Hawaii (1795–1893), Republic of Hawaii (1894–98), and then Territory of Hawaii (1898–1959) became the 50th U.S. State on 21 August 1959. None of the territories or states mentioned above had a coat of arms represented on national currency.

==== Authorization ====
The design of a state coat of arms or seal has generally been authorized by a provision in the state constitution or a legislative act. In most instances a committee (more often than not consisting of three members) was appointed to study the issue, seek advice from qualified artists, historians, legal scholars, etc., and report back to the authorizing legislative body with a design for their approval. Historically, this committee has consisted of notable members of society and elected officials.

The first committee to design the Great Seal of the United States was appointed on 4 July 1776 by the Second Continental Congress and consisted of Benjamin Franklin, John Adams, Thomas Jefferson. Their design was rejected on 20 August 1776. The second committee (James Lovell, John Morin Scott, and William Churchill Houston) design met with the same fate. It was the third committee (Arthur Middleton, Elias Boudinot, John Rutledge, who consulted with William Barton) that submitted a design which was approved on 20 July 1782.

Individual states approached their coats of arms and seals in a similar manner (i.e., seeking direction from the statesmen and scholars of their community). A few of those involved in the design of state arms and seals include (but is not limited to): John Jay and Gouverneur Morris (New York); Francis Hopkinson (New Jersey); David Rittenhouse and George Clymer (Pennsylvania); and George Mason, Benjamin Franklin, Benjamin West, and Thomas Jefferson (Virginia).

An impression of the Great Seal of a state (or its coat of arms) has long been required on official documents ranging from deeds to legislative acts. It was the emblem that certified the authenticity of a given document or that the authority of the state was invested in said document. Judicial decisions upheld the need for a valid seal and/or coat of arms on notarized documents. (Note: Tickner et al. v. Roberts, 11 La. 14 (Louisiana Supreme Court March 1837) ("...notarial instruments were required to be authenticated by a seal, containing the coat of arms of the territory, the name and surname of the notary, his official capacity, and the place in which he exercised his office...the protest in this case, lacking the seal, which the law of that State prescribed, it appears to us, ought not to be received in evidence in our courts.")..)

One of the more compelling legislative actions recognizing the legal importance/authority of the state seal and arms occurred in February 1873 when a joint session of the United States Congress refused to recognize Arkansas's electoral votes in the November 1872 presidential election. The official tally of the state's electoral votes was submitted with an invalid seal (bearing the coat of arms of the office of the Secretary of the State of Arkansas versus the seal of the state of Arkansas bearing the state arms).

Courts and state legislatures also opined on the inappropriate uses of state seals and arms. Most states barred their use for any kind of advertising. (Note: For example, see Commonwealth v. R.I. Sherman Manufacturing Company, 189 Mass. 76 (Massachusetts Supreme Judicial Court 8 Sep 1905) ("The Massachusetts statute prohibiting the use of its arms or seal for advertising or commercial purposes is not in conflict with the clause of the Constitution of the United States investing Congress with power to regulate commerce among the several states")..) Reproduction for corporate use was similarly prohibited and such infractions were classified as offenses against public property. The 2003 Code of Federal Regulations pertaining to the Bureau of Alcohol, Tobacco, Firearms and Explosives prohibits the use of state seals or coats of arms in product branding so as not to mislead the public into thinking that a commercial product has been endorsed by a government organization.

== Other jurisdictions ==
District/Territory	Arms	Blazon	Article
District of Columbia	District of Columbia coat of arms	Organic Act – 21 February 1790; Arms – 3 August 1871	Coat of arms of the District of Columbia (Wikimedia Commons category)
Puerto Rico	Puerto Rico coat of arms		Coat of arms of the Commonwealth of Puerto Rico

=== Counties ===
==== Florida ====
St. Johns

==== Maryland ====
Harford

Montgomery

Prince George's

==== Virginia ====
Fairfax

Prince George

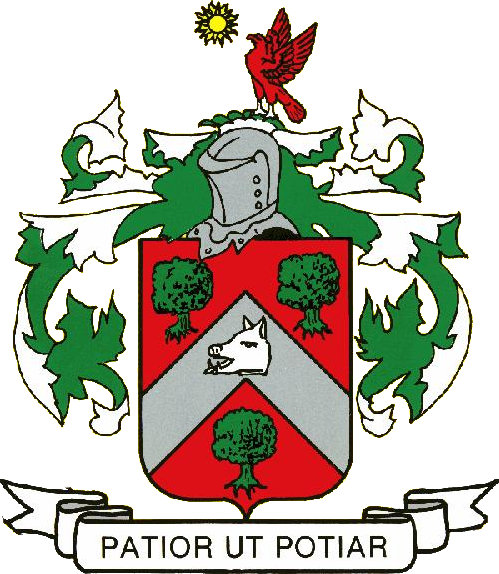
Spotsylvania

==== Texas ====
Bexar

== See also ==
- United States heraldry
- Historical coats of arms of the U.S. states from 1876
- List of U.S. state, district, and territorial insignia
- Seals of the U.S. states
- Seals of governors of the U.S. states
- Flags of governors of the U.S. states
- Armorial of North America – Coats of arms of countries
