= Historical armorial of U.S. states from 1876 =

State Arms of the Union (title page, illustrated, 1876)

Historical coats of arms of the U.S. states date back to the admission of the first states to the Union. Despite the widely accepted practice of determining early statehood from the date of ratification of the United States Constitution, many of the original colonies referred to themselves as states shortly after the Declaration of Independence was signed on 4 July 1776. Committees of political leaders and intellectuals were established by state legislatures to research and propose a seal and coat of arms. Many of these members were signers of the Articles of Confederation, Declaration of Independence, and United States Constitution. Several of the earliest adopted state coats of arms and seals were similar or identical to their colonial counterparts.

State Arms of the Union, illustrated by Henry Mitchell and published by Louis Prang (known as the father of the lithographic industry), offers historically accurate renderings of the state's coats of arms as they existed in 1876. An accomplished engraver with the Bureau of Engraving and Printing for 40 years, Mitchell was responsible for engraving several coats of arms for official state use as well as arms for well-known educational and philanthropic organizations. The illustrations are presented alongside proof impressions from the engraved dies used to print the state arms on the first issue of United States National Bank Notes.

== Coat of arms ==
Heraldic arms were worn (embroidered) on a coat which knights wore over their armor, hence coat of arms, a term which dates back roughly 1,000 years to jousting tournaments.

=== Arms versus seal ===
A state coat of arms may exist independently of the seal, but the reverse is not generally the case. A seal contains a coat of arms or other devices whereas a state coat of arms constitutes the bulk of a seal, except for the wording identifying it as the "Great Seal of the State of..." A "seal" has been described as the design impressed on public or legislative official documents, whereas a coat of arms generally appears for illustrative purposes. Examples include flags and banners, and state militia uniform caps and buttons, as well as specifically designed regimental coats of arms for U.S. Infantry Regiments, and National Guard units.

A coat of arms of a nation or state is usually the design or device of the obverse of its seal. It is an official emblem, mark of identification, and symbol of the authority of the government of a nation or state. A nation or state's coat of arms is oftentimes referred to as the national or state arms.

=== Design ===
The design of a state coat of arms or seal has generally been authorized by a provision in the state constitution or a legislative act. In most instances, a committee (more often than not consisting of three members) was appointed to study the issue, seek advice from qualified artists, historians, legal scholars, etc., and report back to the authorizing legislative body with a design for their approval. Historically, this committee has consisted of notable members of society and elected officials.

The first committee to design the Great Seal of the United States was appointed on 4 July 1776 by the Second Continental Congress and consisted of Benjamin Franklin, John Adams, Thomas Jefferson. Their design was rejected on 20 August 1776. The second committee (James Lovell, John Morin Scott, and William Churchill Houston) design met with the same fate. It was the third committee (Arthur Middleton, Elias Boudinot, John Rutledge, who consulted with William Barton) that submitted a design which was approved on 20 July 1782.

Individual states approached their coats of arms and seals in a similar manner (i.e., seeking direction from the statesmen and scholars of their community). A few of those involved in the design of state arms and seals include (but is not limited to): John Jay and Gouverneur Morris (New York); Francis Hopkinson (New Jersey); David Rittenhouse and George Clymer (Pennsylvania); and George Mason, Benjamin Franklin, Benjamin West, and Thomas Jefferson (Virginia).

=== Authority ===
An impression of the Great Seal of a state (or its coat of arms) has long been required on official documents ranging from deeds to legislative acts. It was the emblem that certified the authenticity of a given document or that the authority of the state was invested in the said document. Judicial decisions upheld the need for a valid seal and/or coat of arms on notarized documents. (Note: Tickner et al. v. Roberts, 11 La. 14 (Louisiana Supreme Court March 1837) ("...notarial instruments were required to be authenticated by a seal, containing the coat of arms of the territory, the name and surname of the notary, his official capacity, and the place in which he exercised his office...the protest in this case, lacking the seal, which the law of that State prescribed, it appears to us, ought not to be received in evidence in our courts."), archived from the original..)

One of the more compelling legislative actions recognizing the legal importance/authority of the state seal and arms occurred in February 1873 when a joint session of the United States Congress refused to recognize Arkansas's electoral votes in the November 1872 presidential election. The official tally of the state's electoral votes was submitted with an invalid seal (bearing the coat of arms of the office of the Secretary of the State of Arkansas versus the seal of the state of Arkansas bearing the state arms).

=== Regulation ===
Courts and state legislatures also opined on the inappropriate uses of state seals and arms. Most states barred their use for any kind of advertising. (Note: For example, see Commonwealth v. R.I. Sherman Manufacturing Company, 189 Mass. 76 (Massachusetts Supreme Judicial Court 8 Sep 1905) ("The Massachusetts statute prohibiting the use of its arms or seal for advertising or commercial purposes is not in conflict with the clause of the Constitution of the United States investing Congress with power to regulate commerce among the several states")..) Reproduction for corporate use was similarly prohibited and such infractions were classified as offenses against public property. The 2003 Code of Federal Regulations pertaining to the Bureau of Alcohol, Tobacco, Firearms and Explosives prohibits the use of state seals or coats of arms in product branding so as not to mislead the public into thinking that a commercial product has been endorsed by a government organization.

=== Instances of design inaccuracies ===
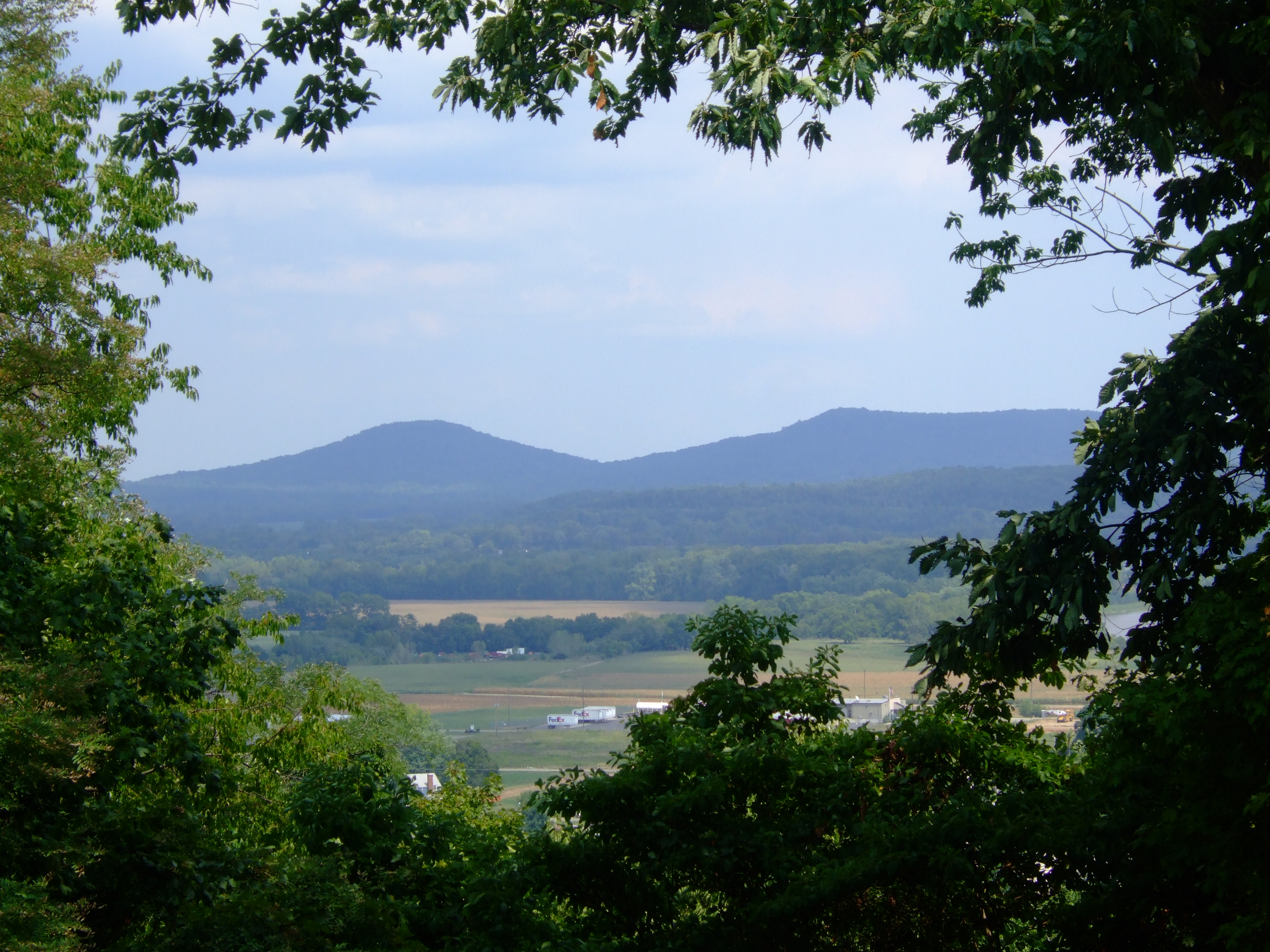
Ohio's seal depicts Mount Logan (elevation 1,243 ft (379 m)) and nearby summits in Chillicothe.

A state coat of arms provided an opportunity to convey the natural and industrial resources available to its residents. Common themes depicted in state arms include farming, industry, transportation (e.g., boats, trains, and wagons), and nature (e.g., sunsets and mountains). The Ohio and Indiana state arms depict fairly substantial mountains in the distance. In reality, the highest points in Ohio and Indiana are Campbell Hill (1,550 feet (470 m)) and Hoosier Hill (1,257 feet (383 m)) respectively.

The Florida state arms also depicts mountains in the distance but the highest point in the state is 345 feet (105 m) feet high. In addition to the distortion of local geography, the image also contains historically inaccurate information. The period depicted in the state arms (c. 1830) was a time when the local Seminole Native Americans were hostile toward white settlers; the warm greeting (e.g., flower petals strewn on the ground) offered by the Seminole to the arriving steam ship would have been highly improbable. Furthermore, the Seminole woman depicted would not have worn any headdress, particularly one of northern and western Seminole tribes.

== State Arms of the Union ==
Published in 1876 by Louis Prang and illustrated by Henry Mitchell, State Arms of the Union contains a chromolithographed title page depicting the Great Seal of the United States and seven color plates with 45 state and territorial coats of arms. The book was likely published for the Philadelphia Centennial Exposition.

=== Louis Prang ===
Louis Prang was born 12 March 1824 in Breslau. At the age of 13 he began apprenticing for his father and learned to dye and print calico, as well as wood and metal engraving. Prang emigrated to Boston in 1850 and became an illustrator for a number of local publications. Starting a business partnership in 1856 to manufacture copper and lithographic plates, Prang became sole proprietor in 1860 and named the company L. Prang & Co. He specialized in color printing, more specifically "chromolithography" Prang spent over four decades studying and creating a standard of colors and engraved and printed maps, prints of contemporary celebrities, and color reproductions of famous works of art.

In 1875 Prang was responsible for introducing the Christmas card to America. He created an annual design competition for his Christmas cards (run between 1880 and 1884), and judges included John La Farge, Samuel Colman, Stanford White, and Louis Comfort Tiffany. Some of the notable winners included Elihu Vedder, Rosina Emmet Sherwood, Edwin Blashfield, Thomas Moran, and Will Hicok Low. Prang has become known as the "father of the American Christmas card", as well as the "father of the lithographic industry".

=== Henry Mitchell ===
Henry Mitchell was born in New York in 1835 and went to school in Philadelphia. At the age of 10 he began working with his uncle to learn the trade of gem and steel engraving. By the age of 20 (1855), Mitchell had engraved the official seals for the Kingdom of Hawaii.

In 1868 Mitchell joined the Bureau of Engraving and Printing and for 40 years engraved stamped envelopes. Through his BEP work, Mitchell was also responsible for engraving the seal of the Secretary of the Navy and the Internal Revenue Service. He also engraved the state seals for Massachusetts, New York, New Hampshire, Vermont, Rhode Island, and Wisconsin. Outside of state and federal government engraving, Mitchell engraved the seals and coats of arms for many well-known institutions which include Harvard University, Society of the Cincinnati, and Boston Public Library. He engraved the Philadelphia Centennial Exhibition award medal (1876) which was struck in the Philadelphia Mint. In 1891, Mitchell was invited by the Secretary of the Treasury to join a committee to evaluate the artistic design proposals for a new issue of U.S. coins. The two other members were Charles E. Barber, Chief Engraver of the United States Mint, and Augustus Saint-Gaudens.

In addition to being considered an expert on heraldry, Mitchell was regarded as one of the best engravers and medal designers in the United States.

== State Arms depicted on United States banknotes ==
The National Bank Act (12 Stat. 532) authorized the issue of a national currency. Historical vignettes on the front and back were the same by denomination (e.g., Landing of Columbus was on the reverse of all $5 notes) and the state coat of arms (located on the reverse left side) was coordinated with the geographic location of the issuing bank. Records do not clearly state who bore the responsibility for the design of the state arms (i.e., the U.S. Treasury Department, or the three bank note companies contracted for engraving and printing). It appears that the first dies (for New Jersey, Missouri, Minnesota, and Vermont) were completed by the American Bank Note Company by 9 October 1863 based on their own drawings. State arms appeared on the reverse of the Original and 1875 Series notes (first and second issue of the first design), and the 1882 Brown Back Series (the second design) of National Bank Notes.

Examples of arms depicted on Colonial and National currency
Location	Colonial Currency	National Banknotes	Information
Connecticut	Connecticut colonial seal detail (1775)	Connecticut state coat of arms from the reverse of the National Bank Note Series 1882BB	Colonial (1775) (Note: Although the pictured example is from a 1776 colonial note, the arms depicted was designed and adopted on 25 October 1711.); National (1863) (Note: Although the example used is a Series of 1882 Brown Back, the coat of arms on the first issue 1860s notes used the same engraved dies for the arms.)
Maryland	Maryland colonial seal detail (1770)	Maryland state coat of arms from the reverse of the National Bank Note Series 1882BB	Colonial (1770); National (1864)
Rhode Island	Rhode Island colonial seal detail (1738)	Rhode Island state coat of arms from the reverse of the National Bank Note Series 1882BB	Colonial (1738); National (1863)
South Carolina	South Carolina colonial seal detail (1778)	South Carolina state coat of arms from the reverse of the National Bank Note Series 1882BB	Colonial (1778); National (1865)

== Historical coats of arms ==
The main table contains four columns. Location refers to either the territory or state and is linked to the most relevant article (e.g., Seal of... or Coat of arms of...). All but one of the illustrations are included in a relevant article. Coat of arms contains the State Arms of the Union illustrations. National Bank Note contains the state arms found on U.S. National Currency between 1863 and the 1890s. Information lists the date of statehood and/or territorial organic act date and the date the state or territorial arms were accepted by constitutional convention or legislative assembly.

Historical coats of arms
Location	Coat of arms (Note: Any missing images in this column indicates that at that time of publication (1876) a given territory had not attained statehood and/or did not have an official territorial coat of arms.)	National Bank Note	Information (Note: The date listed for the adoption of the state arms refers to the design illustrated in State Arms of the Union. Column sort function is chronological based on the date of statehood (ratification of the U.S. Constitution) or territorial status (Organic Act).)
Alabama	Alabama state coat of arms	Alabama state coat of arms from the reverse of the National Bank Note Series 1882BB	Statehood – 14 December 1819; Arms – 29 December 1868
Arkansas	Arkansas state coat of arms	Arkansas state coat of arms from the reverse of the National Bank Note Series 1882BB	Statehood – 15 June 1836; Arms – 3 May 1864
California	California state coat of arms	California state coat of arms from the reverse of the National Bank Note Series 1882BB	Statehood – 9 September 1850; Arms – 2 October 1849
Colorado	Colorado state coat of arms	Colorado state coat of arms from the reverse of the National Bank Note Series 1882BB	Statehood – 1 August 1876; Arms – 13 June 1877
Connecticut	Connecticut state coat of arms	Connecticut state coat of arms from the reverse of the National Bank Note Series 1882BB	Statehood – 9 January 1788; Arms – October 1842
Dakota Territory	Dakota territory coat of arms	Dakota Territory coat of arms from the reverse of the National Bank Note Series 1882BB	Organic Act – 2 March 1861; Arms – 3 January 1863
Delaware	Delaware state coat of arms	Delaware state coat of arms from the reverse of the National Bank Note Series 1882BB	Statehood – 7 December 1787; Arms – 18 January 1847
District of Columbia	District of Columbia coat of arms	District of Columbia state coat of arms from the reverse of the National Bank Note Series 1882BB	Organic Act – 21 February 1790; Arms – 3 August 1871
Florida	Florida state coat of arms	Florida state coat of arms from the reverse of the National Bank Note Series 1882BB	Statehood – 3 March 1845; Arms – 6 August 1868
Georgia	Georgia state coat of arms	Georgia state coat of arms from the reverse of the National Bank Note Series 1882BB	Statehood – 2 January 1788; Arms – 8 February 1799
Idaho Territory	Idaho territory coat of arms	Idaho Territory coat of arms from the reverse of the National Bank Note Series 1882BB	Organic Act – 3 March 1863; Arms – 13 March 1866; Statehood – 3 July 1890
Illinois	Illinois state coat of arms	Illinois state coat of arms from the reverse of the National Bank Note Series 1882BB	Statehood – 3 December 1818; Arms – 7 March 1867
Indiana	Indiana state coat of arms	Indiana state coat of arms from the reverse of the National Bank Note Series 1882BB	Statehood – 11 December 1816; Arms – 13 December 1816
Iowa	Iowa state coat of arms	Iowa state coat of arms from the reverse of the National Bank Note Series 1882BB	Statehood – 28 December 1846; Arms – 25 February 1847
Kansas	Kansas state coat of arms	Kansas state coat of arms from the reverse of the National Bank Note Series 1882BB	Statehood – 29 January 1861; Arms – 25 May 1861 (Note: The Kansas state coat of arms on the back of the 1882BB was engraved by Timothy House of the Bureau of Engraving and Printing.)
Kentucky	Kentucky state coat of arms	Kentucky state coat of arms from the reverse of the National Bank Note Series 1882BB	Statehood – 1 June 1792; Arms – 20 December 1792 (Note: The Kentucky coat of arms on the back of the 1882BB was engraved by Alfred Jones of the Bureau of Engraving and Printing.)
Louisiana	Louisiana state coat of arms	Louisiana state coat of arms from the reverse of the National Bank Note Series 1882BB	Statehood – 30 April 1812; Arms – 23 December 1813 (Note: The illustrated Louisiana coat of arms represents a small design change in 1864, but the concept and design elements were in place since 1813.) (Note: The Louisiana coat of arms on the back of the 1882BB was engraved by Louis Delnoce of the Bureau of Engraving and Printing.)
Maine	Maine state coat of arms	Maine state coat of arms from the reverse of the National Bank Note Series 1882BB	Statehood – 15 March 1820; Arms – 9 June 1820
Maryland	Maryland state coat of arms	Maryland state coat of arms from the reverse of the National Bank Note Series 1882BB	Statehood – 28 April 1788; Arms – 18 March 1876 (Note: The illustrated coat of arms of Maryland was the tenth version of the seal, and a restoration to the description offered by Lord Baltimore on 12 August 1648).) (Note: The Maryland coat of arms on the back of the 1882BB was engraved by W.W. Rice of the Bureau of Engraving and Printing.)
Massachusetts	Massachusetts state coat of arms	Massachusetts state coat of arms from the reverse of the National Bank Note Series 1882BB	Statehood – 6 February 1788; Arms – 13 December 1780
Michigan	Michigan state coat of arms	Michigan state coat of arms from the reverse of the National Bank Note Series 1882BB	Statehood – 26 January 1837; Arms – 2 June 1835
Minnesota	Minnesota state coat of arms	Minnesota state coat of arms from the reverse of the National Bank Note Series 1882BB	Statehood – 11 May 1858; Arms – 16 July 1858
Mississippi	Mississippi state coat of arms	Mississippi state coat of arms from the reverse of the National Bank Note Series 1882BB	Statehood – 10 December 1817; Arms – 6 February 1894 (Note: In 1861 Mississippi adopted a coat of arms and state flag. However, in 1865 the approval was rescinded leaving Mississippi without official state arms until 1894. On 6 February 1894 the proposed design for the state coat of arms was approved.)
Missouri	Missouri state coat of arms	Missouri state coat of arms from the reverse of the National Bank Note Series 1882BB	Statehood – 10 August 1821; Arms – 11 January 1822 (Note: The Missouri seal and arms were designed by Judge Robert William Wells.)
Montana Territory	Montana territory coat of arms	Montana state coat of arms from the reverse of the National Bank Note Series 1882BB	Organic Act – 26 May 1864; Arms – 9 February 1865 (Note: According to the State Constitution of Montana, in the event of a transition from a Territorial to State government, the Territorial Seal would remain effective until expressly changed by legislative action.); Statehood – 8 November 1889
Nebraska	Nebraska state coat of arms	Nebraska state coat of arms from the reverse of the National Bank Note Series 1882BB	Statehood – 1 March 1867; Arms – 15 June 1867 (Note: The illustrated arms represent the change from the territorial to state arms. However, the BEP engraved arms were never updated.)
Nevada	Nevada state coat of arms	Nevada state coat of arms from the reverse of the National Bank Note Series 1882BB	Statehood – 31 October 1864; Arms – 24 February 1866
New Hampshire	New Hampshire state coat of arms	New Hampshire state coat of arms from the reverse of the National Bank Note Series 1882BB	Statehood – 21 June 1788; Arms – 12 February 1785
New Jersey	New Jersey state coat of arms	New Jersey state coat of arms from the reverse of the National Bank Note Series 1882BB	Statehood – 18 December 1787; Arms – 10 September 1776 (Note: New Jersey coat of arms was designed by Pierre Eugene Du Simitiere.)
New Mexico Territory	New Mexico territory coat of arms	(Note: The New Mexico coat of arms (territorial or state) was never used on National Bank Notes.)	Organic Act – 9 September 1850; Arms – 1 February 1887; Statehood – 6 January 1912
New York	New York state coat of arms	New York state coat of arms from the reverse of the National Bank Note Series 1882BB	Statehood – 26 July 1788; Arms – 27 March 1809
North Carolina	North Carolina state coat of arms	North Carolina state coat of arms from the reverse of the National Bank Note Series 1882BB	Statehood – 21 November 1789; Arms – 1835
North Dakota	(Note: North Dakota was admitted to the United States on 2 November 1889 (after the 1876 publication of the State Arms of the Union).)	North Dakota state coat of arms from the reverse of the National Bank Note Series 1882BB	Statehood – 2 November 1889; Arms – 1 October 1889
Ohio	Ohio state coat of arms	Ohio state coat of arms from the reverse of the National Bank Note Series 1882BB	Statehood – 1 March 1803; Arms – 1 March 1803 (Note: While the seal of Ohio had experienced several unauthorized varieties in use, in 1868 legislature reverted the official design to the initial seal from the state constitution of 1803.)
Oregon	Oregon state coat of arms	Oregon state coat of arms from the reverse of the National Bank Note Series 1882BB	Statehood – 14 February 1859; Arms – 2 June 1859
Pennsylvania	Pennsylvania state coat of arms	Pennsylvania state coat of arms from the reverse of the National Bank Note Series 1882BB	Statehood – 12 December 1787; Arms – 17 March 1875
Rhode Island	Rhode Island state coat of arms	Rhode Island state coat of arms from the reverse of the National Bank Note Series 1882BB	Statehood – 29 May 1790; Arms – 24 February 1875 (Note: The Rhode Island state coat of arms on the back of the 1882BB was engraved by Timothy House of the Bureau of Engraving and Printing.)
South Carolina	South Carolina state coat of arms	South Carolina state coat of arms from the reverse of the National Bank Note Series 1882BB	Statehood – 23 May 1788; Arms – 2 April 1776
South Dakota	(Note: South Dakota was admitted to the United States on 2 November 1889 (after the 1876 publication of the State Arms of the Union).)	South Dakota state coat of arms from the reverse of the National Bank Note Series 1882BB	Statehood – 2 November 1889; Arms – 1 October 1889
Tennessee	Tennessee state coat of arms	Tennessee state coat of arms from the reverse of the National Bank Note Series 1882BB	Statehood – 1 June 1796; Arms – 24 April 1802 (Note: The Tennessee state coat of arms on the back of the 1882BB was engraved by Timothy House of the Bureau of Engraving and Printing.)
Texas	Texas state coat of arms	Texas state coat of arms from the reverse of the National Bank Note Series 1882BB	Statehood – 29 December 1845; Arms – 25 January 1839
Utah Territory	Utah territory coat of arms	Utah territory coat of arms from the reverse of the National Bank Note Series 1882BB	Organic Act – 9 September 1850; Arms – 9 September 1850; Statehood – 4 January 1896
Vermont	Vermont state coat of arms	Vermont state coat of arms from the reverse of the National Bank Note Series 1882BB	Statehood – 4 March 1791; Arms – 20 February 1779 (Note: On 25 November 1862, Vermont legislature formally recognized the existing seal and coat of arms.)
Virginia	Virginia state coat of arms	Virginia state coat of arms from the reverse of the National Bank Note Series 1882BB	Statehood – 25 June 1788; Arms – 1776 (Note: The coat of arms was engraved in Paris and not ready until 4 September 1779.) (Note: The Virginia coat of arms on the back of the 1882BB was engraved by James Bannister of the Bureau of Engraving and Printing.)
Washington	(Note: The Washington Territory seal was authorized (but never described) during the first session of the Territorial Legislature on 28 February 1854. The coat of arms appearing on National currency was a new design adopted after statehood.)	Washington state coat of arms the reverse of the National Bank Note Series 1882BB	Organic Act – 2 March 1853; Arms – 28 February 1854
West Virginia	West Virginia state coat of arms	West Virginia state coat of arms from the reverse of the National Bank Note Series 1882BB	Statehood – 20 June 1863; Arms – 26 September 1863 (Note: Drawings by Joseph H. Diss Debar.)
Wisconsin	Wisconsin state coat of arms	Wisconsin state coat of arms from the reverse of the National Bank Note Series 1882BB	Statehood – 29 May 1848; Arms – 29 December 1851
Wyoming Territory	Wyoming territory coat of arms	Wyoming territory coat of arms from the reverse of the National Bank Note Series 1882BB	Organic Act – 25 July 1868; Statehood – 10 July 1890

=== Missing territorial or state coats of arms ===
When State Arms of the Union was published in 1876, some existing arms were not included (e.g., Arizona and Washington Territory). At the time, Alaska was classified as the Department of Alaska (1867–84) and became the District of Alaska (1884–1912) before becoming the Territory of Alaska (1912–59). The Alaska territorial seal was designed in 1910 and adopted in 1913. On 3 January 1959 Alaska became the 49th U.S. State. The Oklahoma Territory (1890–1907) Organic Act was approved on 2 May 1890, and a territorial seal was adopted on 10 January 1893. Hawaii, formerly the Kingdom of Hawaii (1795–1893), Republic of Hawaii (1894–98), and then Territory of Hawaii (1898–1959) became the 50th U.S. State on 21 August 1959. None of the territories or states mentioned above had a coat of arms represented on national currency.

== See also ==
- Coats of arms of the U.S. states
