= Flag of Connecticut =

U.S. state flag

State of Connecticut
- Use: Civil and state flag
- Proportion: 3:4
- Adopted: September 9, 1897; 129 years ago
- Design: A white shield with three grapevines on a field of royal/azure blue.
- Azure blue variant
- Use: Variant
- Proportion: 3:4
- Design: A white shield with three grapevines on a field of azure blue.

The flag of the U.S. state of Connecticut is a white baroque shield with three grapevines, each bearing three bunches of purple grapes on a field of royal blue. The banner below the shield reads "Qui Transtulit Sustinet," Latin for "He who transplanted sustains," Connecticut's state motto. The flag dimensions are 5.5 feet (1.7 m) in length and 4.33 feet (1.32 m) in width.

== Statute ==
The 2024 Connecticut General Statutes, § 3-107 defines that the flag shall be:

"azure blue, charged with an argent white shield of rococo design, having in the center three grape vines, supported and bearing fruit in natural colors. The bordure to the shield shall be in two colors, gold on the interior and silver on the exterior, adorned with natural-colored clusters of white oak leaves (Quercus alba) bearing acorns. Below the shield shall be a white streamer, cleft at each end, bordered by a band of gold within fine brown lines, and upon the streamer in dark blue block letters shall be the motto 'QUI TRANSTULIT SUSTINET'; the whole design being the arms of the state."

== History ==
The first mention of a state flag was in 1838, It was carried by a local sheriff during the New Haven Centennial parade. Its design was never described.

In 1845, Mr. Hamltion of the state senate introduced a bill outlining a state flag. It was an American flag with the state's coat of arms on it. The bill passed the house with $100 (approximately $4,344) being set aside for the project. The flag was only flown when the house was in session.

In 1851, the state legislature gave funds to a local sheriff to procure a new state flag.

During the American Civil War the state senate adopted a new flag. It was described as: "The field of the flag adopted was a deep blue, and the three vines, which had been on the Connecticut flag from the outset, were on a groundwork of white." Its nickname was Blue Peter, and it was usually hanging in the halls of the Old State House.

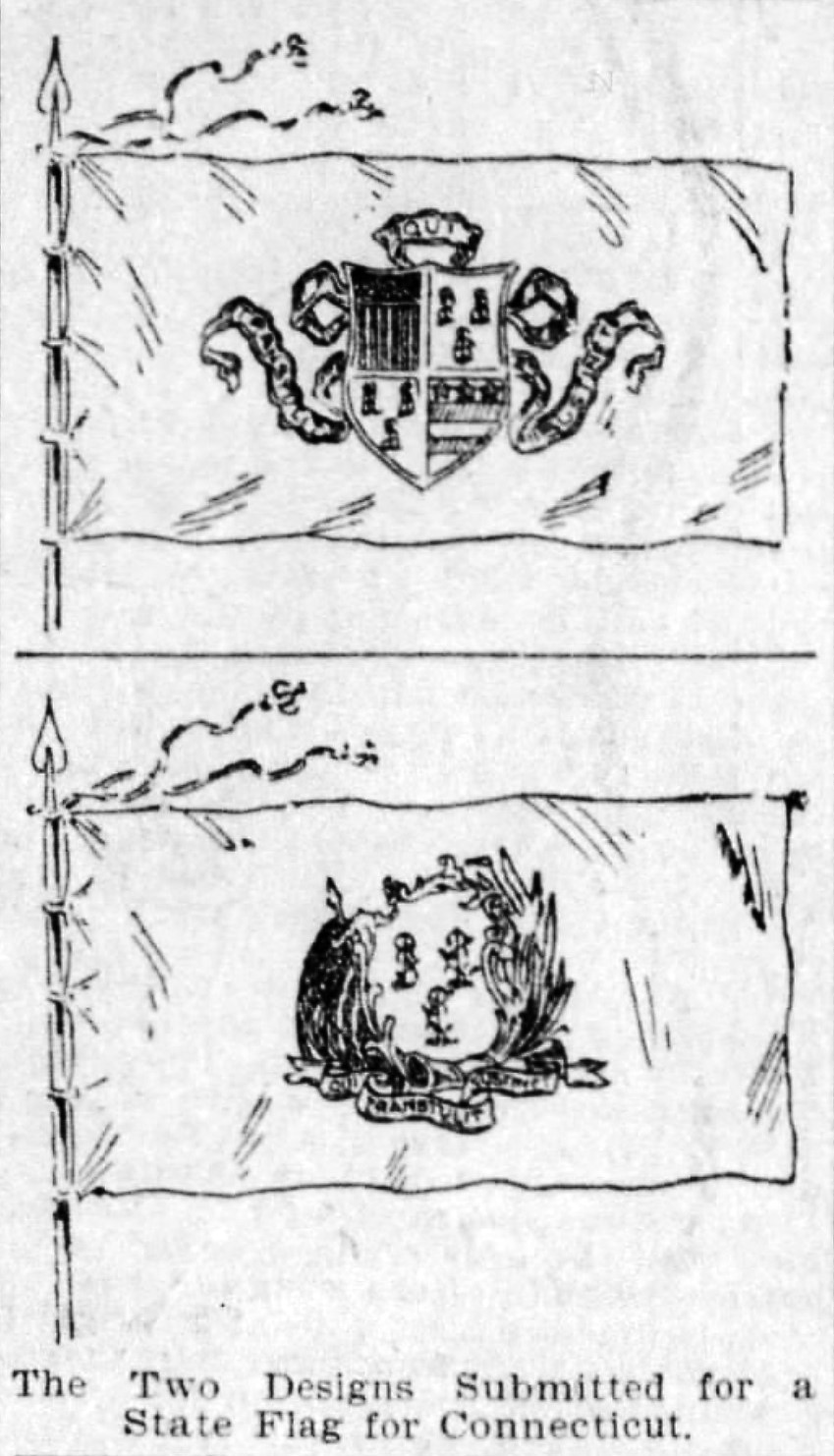
Two designs submitted for a state flag for Connecticut in 1895

In 1869, a new state flag was flown over state house. It was described as: "It is twenty feet by thirty feet. A white shield in the centre bears Connecticut coat of arms, the stars being grouped around it."

On June 18, 1887, Governor Lounsbury displayed a state flag during a parade in New Haven. Its design is unknown. Another one was flown in August at Camp Lounsbury in Niantic containing a white field.

In 1893, a party was being held in the city of Trenton, New Jersey celebrating the unveiling of the Trenton Battle Monument. The city was patriotically decorated and in the New Jersey state house flew 13 state flags belonging to the original 13 colonies. Connecticut's state flag had a white field with a pine tree in the middle and the state motto "Qui Transtulit Sustinet." It was based off the Pine Tree Flag from the American revolution.

In 1897, the Connecticut General Assembly approved a new flag after it was introduced by Governor Owen Vincent Coffin in 1895. Abby Day Slocomb, the regent of the Anna Warner Bailey chapter of the Daughters of the American Revolution, submitted the design.

== Origin ==
The design comes from the seal of Saybrook Colony, designed by George Fenwick when it was established in 1639. That seal depicted 15 grapevines and a hand in the upper left corner with a scroll reading "Sustinet qui transtulit." When the Connecticut Colony bought Saybrook in 1644, the seal transferred to the Connecticut Colony. On October 25, 1711, the governor and legislature changed the seal. They reduced the number of grapevines from 15 to three, to represent the three oldest settlements (Windsor, Wethersfield, and Hartford) (or possibly the three separate settlements, Connecticut Colony, Saybrook Colony, and New Haven Colony, which had been absorbed into Connecticut by that time) and rearranged the wording and position of the motto.

=== Gallery ===
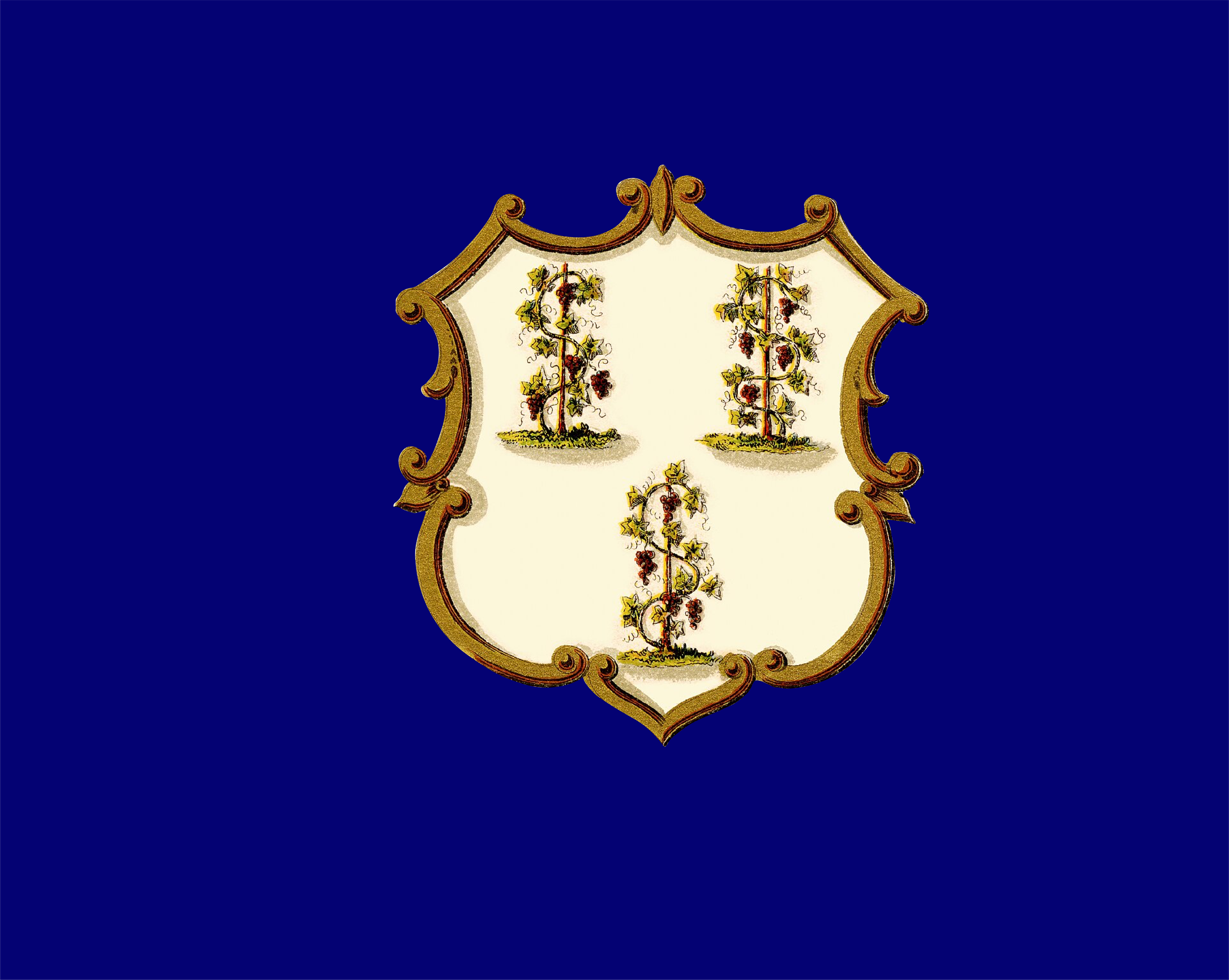
Digital reconstruction of the state flag flown during the Civil War

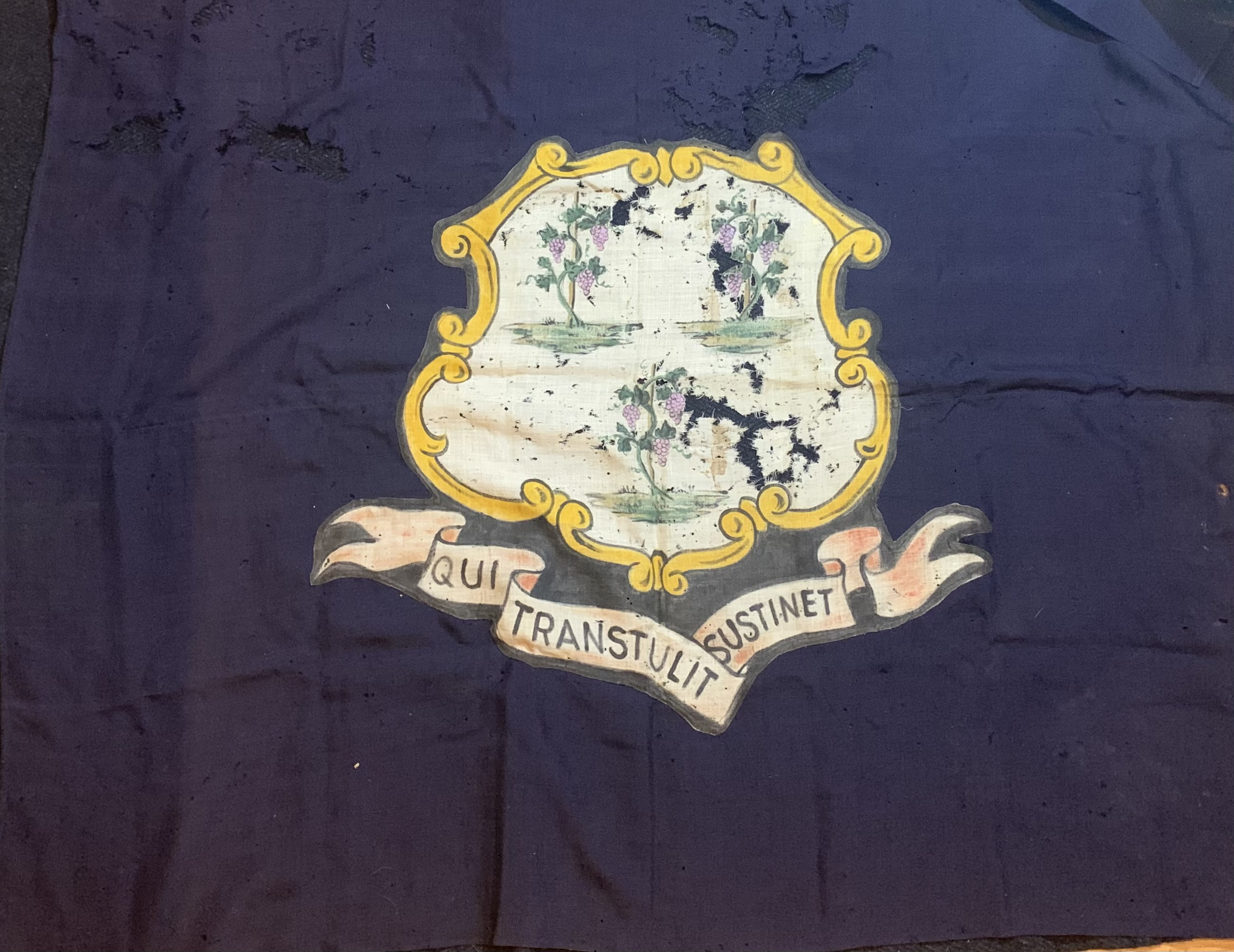
Early state flag

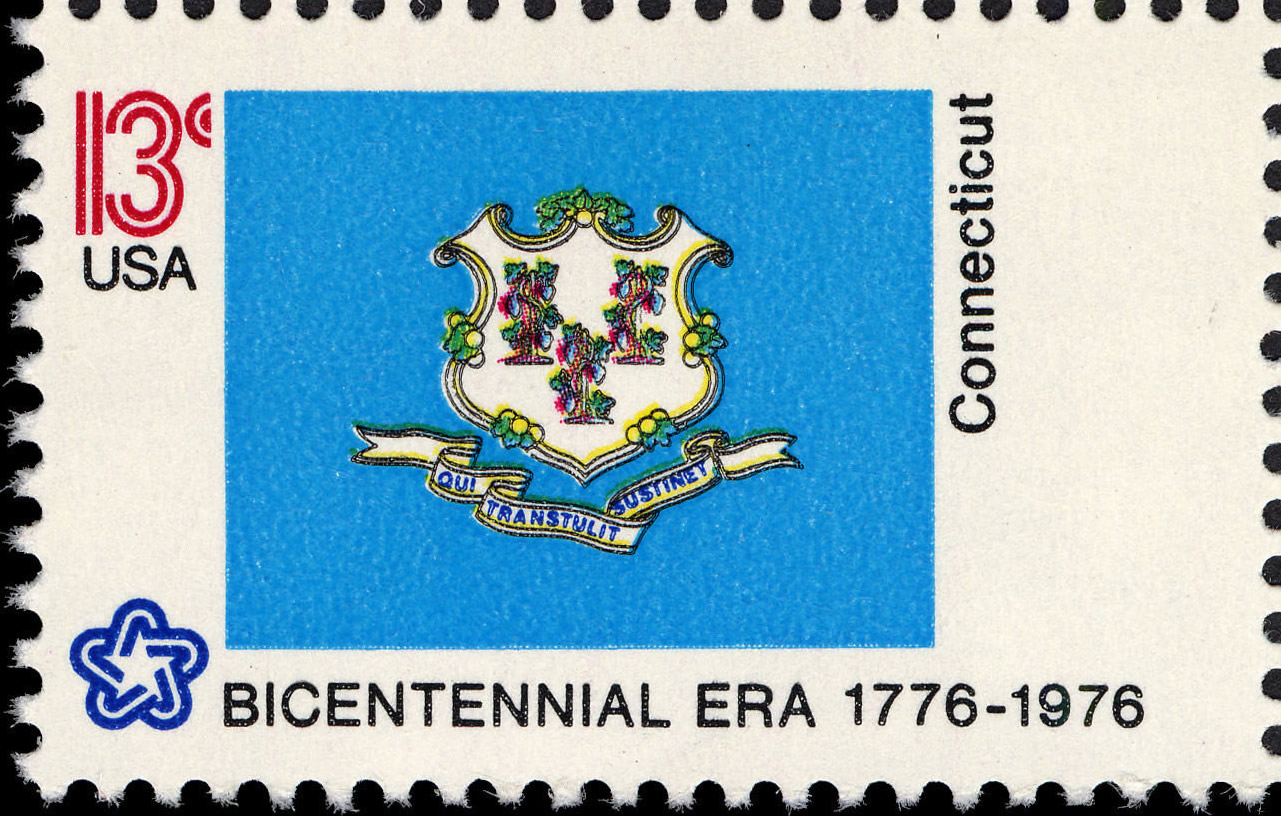
The Connecticut state flag as depicted in the 1976 bicentennial postage stamp series

== Flying the flag at half staff ==
Customarily, the flag of Connecticut is flown at half-staff when the federal flag is, which may be ordered by the President or the Governor. According to 2007-R-0624, only the governor of Connecticut may decide that the state flag should be flown at half-staff, though the right is a power of office and not a law.

Typically, the state flag is flown at half-staff upon the death of a Connecticut resident serving in the armed forces, upon the death of a former governor or serving member of the state legislature, or for an event of great sorrow for Connecticut.

== Other flags ==
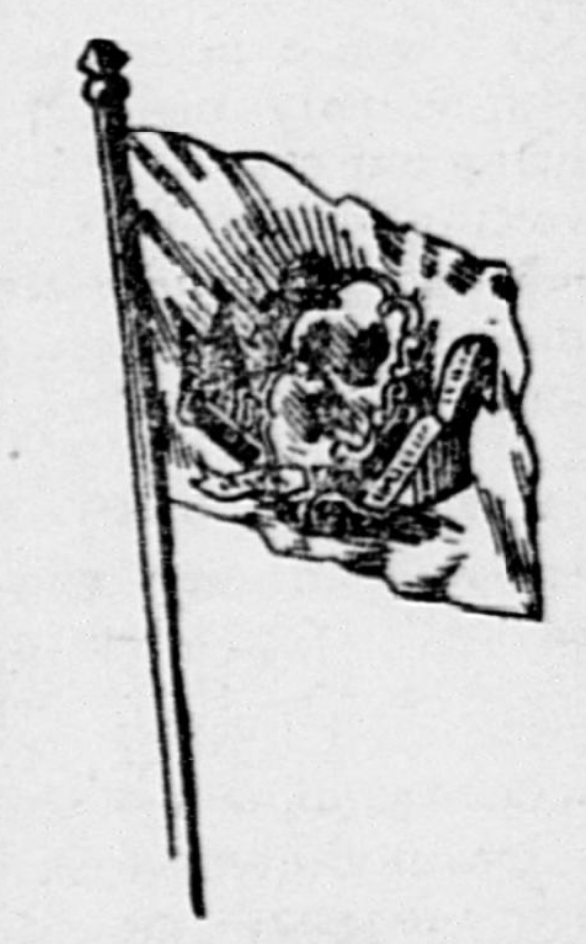
National Guard flag from 1896

In 1891, the Governor held a large state Military parade in Niantic. During the precession a group of troop carried a guidon with the state coat of arms.

During the Spanish-American War, the state organized two regiments of infantry (1st & 3rd) and three artillery batteries. The infantry carried the Stars and Stripes bearing the name of the regiment on the stripes. Their regimental flag was blue with the state coat of arms in the center and the name of the regiment placed above in gold.

In 1900, the New York Society of Sons of the Revolution sent the historic Nathen Hale schoolhouse to the Connecticut Society Sons of the Revolution. One year later, members of the society got permission to move and restore the building. To celebrate the restoration, the society invited Governor McLean and some companies of the National Guard to celebrate. The men carried with them a state flag and a state banner. The banner design was not described, but it most likely flew vertically.

In 1912, state delegates when to the Democratic National Convention in Baltimore, they carried with them a state banner. It was made of blue silk and bore the words "Our choice of president-Simeon E. Baldwin," and the coat of arms in the middle incorrectly bearing oak leafs instead of grapevines. At the top of it was a triangle with the word "Connecticut." The whole thing measured 8 feet long, it also bore some scars from other delegates trying to tear it from the bearers.

=== Historical flags used in Connecticut ===
The naval Red Ensign of the former Kingdom of England, from which the flags of New England are derived.

The First Flag (and Ensign) of New England used by merchant ships sailing out of New England ports.

After the union of England and Scotland, some New England ensigns used the British Union Flag rather than St. George's Cross.

The Flag of New England with St George's Cross removed.

The Flag flown during the Dominion of New England, using the personal standard of Edmund Andros

== See also ==
- State of Connecticut
  - Symbols of the state of Connecticut
    - Great Seal of the State of Connecticut
    - Coat of arms of Connecticut
