= Puerto Rican heraldry =

National heraldry

Puerto Rican heraldry has no precise rules, because its evolution has been according to the ideas and prevailing customs of every time of its history.

The Coat of Arms was granted by Ferdinand II of Aragon to the island of San Juan.

== Seals ==
There are several seals of the different sections of the Puerto Rican government.

Seal of the governor of Puerto Rico

A variant of the governor's seal

Seal of the governor-elect

Seal of the secretary of state of Puerto Rico

Seal of the Legislative Assembly of Puerto Rico

House of Representatives of Puerto Rico

Seal of the Senate of Puerto Rico

A variant of the seal of the Senate
