= Coat of arms of Connecticut =

Coat of arms of the State of Connecticut

Coat of arms of the State of Connecticut
- Armiger: State of Connecticut
- Adopted: March 24, 1931
- Shield: Argent, three grapevines proper
- Motto: QUI TRANSTULIT SUSTINET "He Who Transplanted Still Sustains"

The coat of arms of Connecticut is an official emblem of the state of Connecticut, alongside the seal and state flag. The General Assembly of Connecticut adopted a design for the official arms of the state on March 24, 1931, which it ordered to be drawn and filed with the Secretary of the State.

== Description ==
The official blazon of the arms calls for: A shield of rococo design of white field, having in the center three grape vines, supported and bearing fruit. Below the shield shall be a white streamer, cleft at each end, bordered with two fine lines, and upon the streamer shall be in solid letters of medium bold Gothic the motto: "QUI TRANSTULIT SUSTINET" (He Who Transplanted Still Sustains)

While adopted in 1931, the coat of arms had appeared on the state flag since 1887.

== Motto ==
Qui transtulit sustinet (Latin "He who transplanted sustains", or "[He (i.e., God)] Who Bore [Us] Across [the Ocean] Sustains [Us]" or "[He] Who Transplanted Continues to Sustain") is the state motto of Connecticut depicted on a blue ribbon below the grapevines.

The motto has been re-used for the name of Connecticut’s SustiNet program to provide health care to state residents.

== Grapevines ==
The grapevines are said to represent more specifically either early towns or the early individual colonies. Some 19th-century versions of the Connecticut Great Seal show several grapevines. The best answer today is that the grapevines should be taken to represent the three original colonies of Connecticut: (Hartford), Quinnipiac (New-Haven), and Saybrook, though it can also represent the first three settlements of the Connecticut colony proper—Windsor, Hartford, and Wethersfield, as New Haven and Saybrook were reluctant additions to Connecticut.

== Use ==
Coats of arms of similar design, but of differing tinctures, are used in the state, including on that of the governor.

Seal of the governor of Connecticut

Seal of the lieutenant governor of Connecticut

== See also ==
- Armorial of the United States
- Seal of Connecticut
- Flag of Connecticut
- List of Connecticut state symbols
