= Coat of arms of Mississippi =

Coat of arms of the U.S. state of Mississippi

Coat of arms of the State of Mississippi

Versions
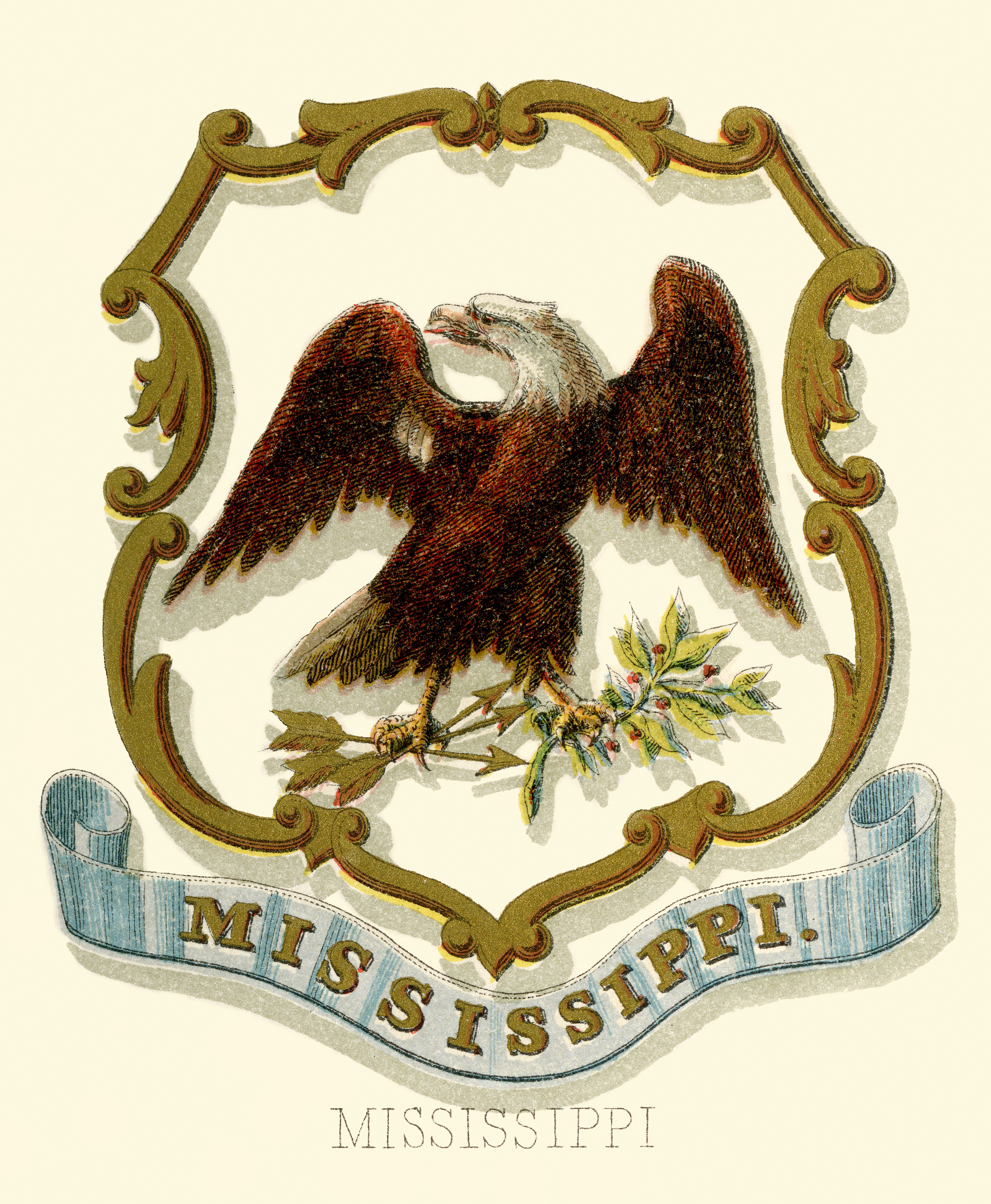
- Historical coat of arms (1876)
- Armiger: State of Mississippi
- Adopted: February 7, 2001 (originally February 7, 1894)
- Motto: Virtute et Armis

The coat of arms of Mississippi is an official symbol of the State of Mississippi.

== Etymology ==
Virtute et armis (Latin "By valor and arms") is a state motto of Mississippi. It may have been suggested by the motto of Lord Gray De Wilton Virtute non armis fido ("I trust in virtue not arms").

== History ==
The committee to design a coat of arms was appointed by legislative action February 7, 1894, and the design proposed was accepted and became the official coat of arms. The committee recommended for the coat of arms a "Shield in color blue, with an eagle upon it with extended pinions, holding in the right talon a palm branch and a bundle of arrows in the left talon, with the word "Mississippi" above the eagle; the lettering on the shield and the eagle to be in gold; below the shield two branches of the cotton stalk, saltierwise, as in submitted design, and a scroll below extending upward and one each side three-fourths of the length of the shield; upon the scroll, which is to be red, the motto be printed in gold letters upon white spaces, as in design accompanying, the motto to be – "Virtute et armis", which means by valor and arms. The coat of arms of Mississippi has been in use since 2001. Even though the design was made official by the 1894 Mississippi Legislature, the law was not included in the Mississippi Code Revision in 1906. In May 2000 the Mississippi Supreme Court ruled that the state of Mississippi did not have an official coat of arms. On February 7, 2001, Mississippi Governor Ronnie Musgrove signed Senate Bill No. 2885 that designated the original design described above as the official Mississippi coat of arms.

== Other uses ==
Many governmental seals of Mississippi use the state coat of arms in their designs.

Seal of the Mississippi Department of Transportation

== See also ==
- Coats of arms of the U.S. states
- Seal of Mississippi
- Seals of the U.S. states
- Flag of Mississippi
