= Seal of Mississippi =

Official government emblem of the U.S. state of Mississippi

Great Seal of the State of Mississippi
- Armiger: State of Mississippi
- Adopted: July 1, 2014
- Torse: THE GREAT SEAL OF THE STATE OF MISSISSIPPI
- Shield: Palewise of eleven pieces Argent and Gules, on a Chief Azure, eleven Mullets Argent
- Supporters: An Eagle displayed Or
- Motto: IN GOD WE TRUST

The Great Seal of the State of Mississippi was adopted in 2014, replacing a previous version that had been used since the 19th century.

== Design ==
The eagle is positioned in the center of the seal, with its wings spread wide and its head held high. Stars and stripes adorn its chest. In its talons, the eagle grasps an olive branch symbolizing a desire for peace and a quiver of arrows representing the power to wage war. The outer circle of the seal contains the text "The Great Seal of the State of Mississippi" at the top and the words "In God We Trust" at the bottom. The governor of Mississippi is tasked by the constitution with safeguarding the seal.

== History ==
The first Mississippian governmental seal was adopted on January 19, 1798, when it was organized under the name of the Mississippi Territory.

After it became a state in 1817, the same seal was designated as the state's seal the following year. In July 2014, Mississippi adopted a new seal, which is still in use today.

On January 31, 2014, purportedly to defend religious freedom, Mississippi's state senate voted to add the words, "In God We Trust" to the state seal and the change was unilaterally made effective on July 1, 2014.

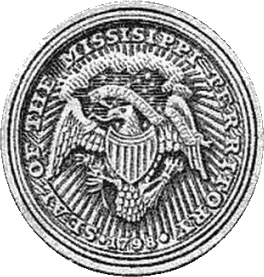
Seal of the Mississippi Territory (1798–1817)

Seal of Mississippi (1818–2014)

== See also ==
- List of Mississippi state symbols
- Coat of arms of Mississippi
- Flag of Mississippi
