= Annapolis Convention (1786) =

Political convention among US states on inter-state trade

- Date: September 11–14, 1786
- Venue: Old Senate Chamber, Maryland State House
- Location: Annapolis, Maryland, USA; 38°58′38.1″N 76°29′24.6″W
- Also known as: Meeting of Commissioners to Remedy Defects of the Federal Government
- Participants: 12

The Annapolis Convention (formally titled a Meeting of Commissioners to Remedy Defects of the Federal Government) was a national political convention held September 11–14, 1786 in the old Senate Chamber of the Maryland State House in Annapolis, Maryland.

(The Maryland Society, Sons of the American Revolution claim the location was at Mann's Tavern where some of the delegates possibly dined and slept.)

In it twelve delegates from five U.S. states (New Jersey, New York, Pennsylvania, Delaware, and Virginia) gathered to discuss and develop a consensus on reversing the protectionist trade barriers that each state had erected. At the time, under the Articles of Confederation, each state was largely independent from the others, and the national government had no authority to regulate trade between and among the states.

New Hampshire, Massachusetts, Rhode Island, and North Carolina had appointed commissioners, who failed to arrive in Annapolis in time to attend the meeting, and Connecticut, Maryland, South Carolina, and Georgia had taken no action at all.

The convention also related to George Washington's plans concerning the waterways connecting the Potomac and the Ohio River.

== Convention ==
Most of the delegates to the meeting were tasked only to take up the issue of trade among the states, but New Jersey's delegates were authorized to discuss a broader scope of reforms. The group realized that the issue of trade touched upon many other aspects of the Confederation and that a future meeting with a broader scope would be necessary to adequately address the problems.

The final report of the convention was adopted unanimously and sent to the Congress of the Confederation and to the states. Its main author was Alexander Hamilton. The report sought support for a broader constitutional convention to be held the following May in Philadelphia. It expressed the hope that more states would be represented and that their delegates or deputies would be authorized to examine areas broader than trade alone.

== Aftermath ==
Because of the few representatives in attendance, their authority was limited. It is unclear how much weight the convention's call carried, but the urgency of the need for constitutional reform was highlighted by a number of rebellions that took place all over the country. Although most of them were easily suppressed, Shays' Rebellion lasted from August 1786 to February 1787. The rebellion called attention to both popular discontent and government weakness.

The direct result of the Annapolis Convention's report and the ensuing events was the 1787 Philadelphia Convention, when the United States Constitution was drafted.

== Delegates ==
These states were represented with delegates:

- New York: Egbert Benson and Alexander Hamilton
- New Jersey: Abraham Clark, William Houston, and James Schureman
- Pennsylvania: Tench Coxe
- Delaware: George Read, John Dickinson, and Richard Bassett
- Virginia: Edmund Randolph, James Madison, and St. George Tucker

== See also ==
- Mount Vernon Conference, 1785 interstate conference on navigation rights presided over by George Washington
