= Seal of Connecticut =

Official government emblem of the United States state of Connecticut

Great Seal of the State of Connecticut

Versions
- Seal of the Colony of Connecticut (1711–1784)

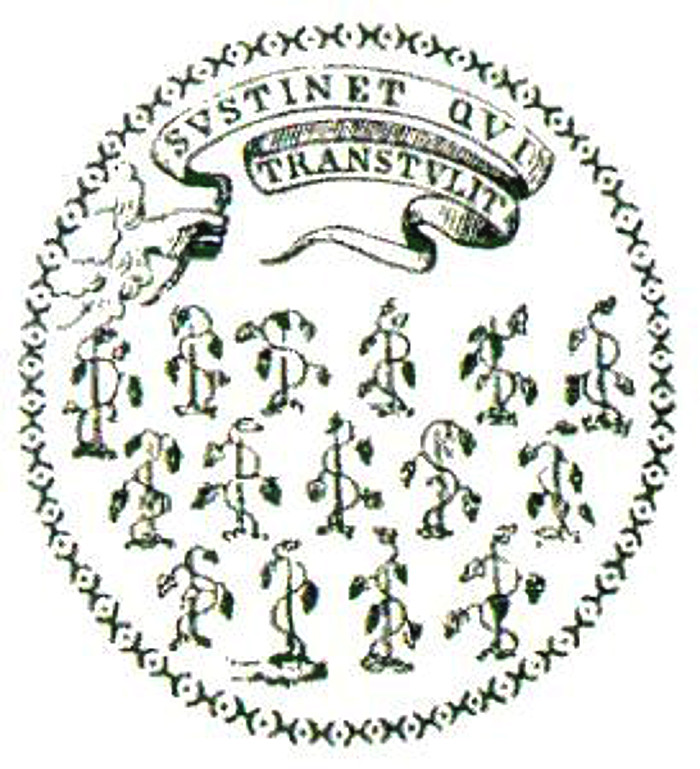
- Seal of the Colony of Connecticut (1639–1687)
- Armiger: State of Connecticut
- Adopted: 1775
- Motto: Qui transtulit sustinet

The Great Seal of the State of Connecticut has been the coat of arms of the U.S. state of Connecticut since May 1784. It depicts three grapevines and a ribbon below with the Latin motto: Qui Transtulit Sustinet (English: He who transplanted sustains), with SIGILLUM REIPUBLICÆ CONNECTICUTENSIS (English: Seal of the State of Connecticut) in the border.

== History ==
The first seal of Connecticut was brought from England by Colonel George Fenwick in 1639. It was the seal of the Saybrook Colony and was turned over to the Connecticut Colony at about the time that it purchased the land and fort at Saybrook Point from Colonel Fenwick in 1644. The seal was used by the General Court (General Assembly) from that time forward, but there is no clear record of who had custody of the seal. On October 9, 1662 the assembly formally declared that the seal would be kept by the secretary of the colony and used as the seal of the colony on necessary occasions. It remained the colony's seal until October 1687, when Sir Edmund Andros took control of the colony's government and the seal disappeared.

On October 25, 1711, a meeting of the governor and Council (upper house of the assembly) resolved, that "a new stamp shall be made and cut of the seal of this Colony, suitable for sealing upon wafers, and that a press be provided with the necessary appurtenances, for that purpose, as soon as may be, at the cost and charge of this Colony, to be kept in the secretary's office". The new, less elaborately decorated seal was larger in size and more oval shaped than the original. The words of the motto remained the same, but the number of grape vines was reduced to three and the legend Sigillum Coloniae Connecticutensis ("Seal of the Connecticut Colony") is added to the edge of the seal. The three vines may have been intended to represent the three colonies: New Haven Colony, Saybrook Colony and Connecticut Colony.

After the conclusion of the Revolutionary War, the inscription on the colonial seal was no longer appropriate. Therefore, in May 1784 the General Assembly directed the secretary to alter the inscription to read SIGILL. REIP. CONNECTICUTENSIS. However, when a new version of the seal was prepared, the inscription contained the words spelled out: SIGILLUM REIPUBLICÆ CONNECTICUTENSIS ("Seal of the Republic of Connecticut"). There has been no subsequent alteration to the official state seal. In 1931 the General Assembly required that all representations of the state seal conform to the description in chapter 54 of the Public Acts of that year. This legislation also prohibited reproduction of the seal except by or under the direction of the secretary of the state. It is the only non-circular state seal out of the fifty states, and is joined only by the seal of Guam when insular areas are included.

== Motto ==
Qui transtulit sustinet (Latin "He who transplanted sustains"; "He who transplanted still sustains"; or "[He] who transplanted continues to sustain") is the state motto of Connecticut depicted on a blue ribbon below the grapevines.

The motto has been re-used for the name of Connecticut's SustiNet program to provide health care to state residents.

== History of motto ==
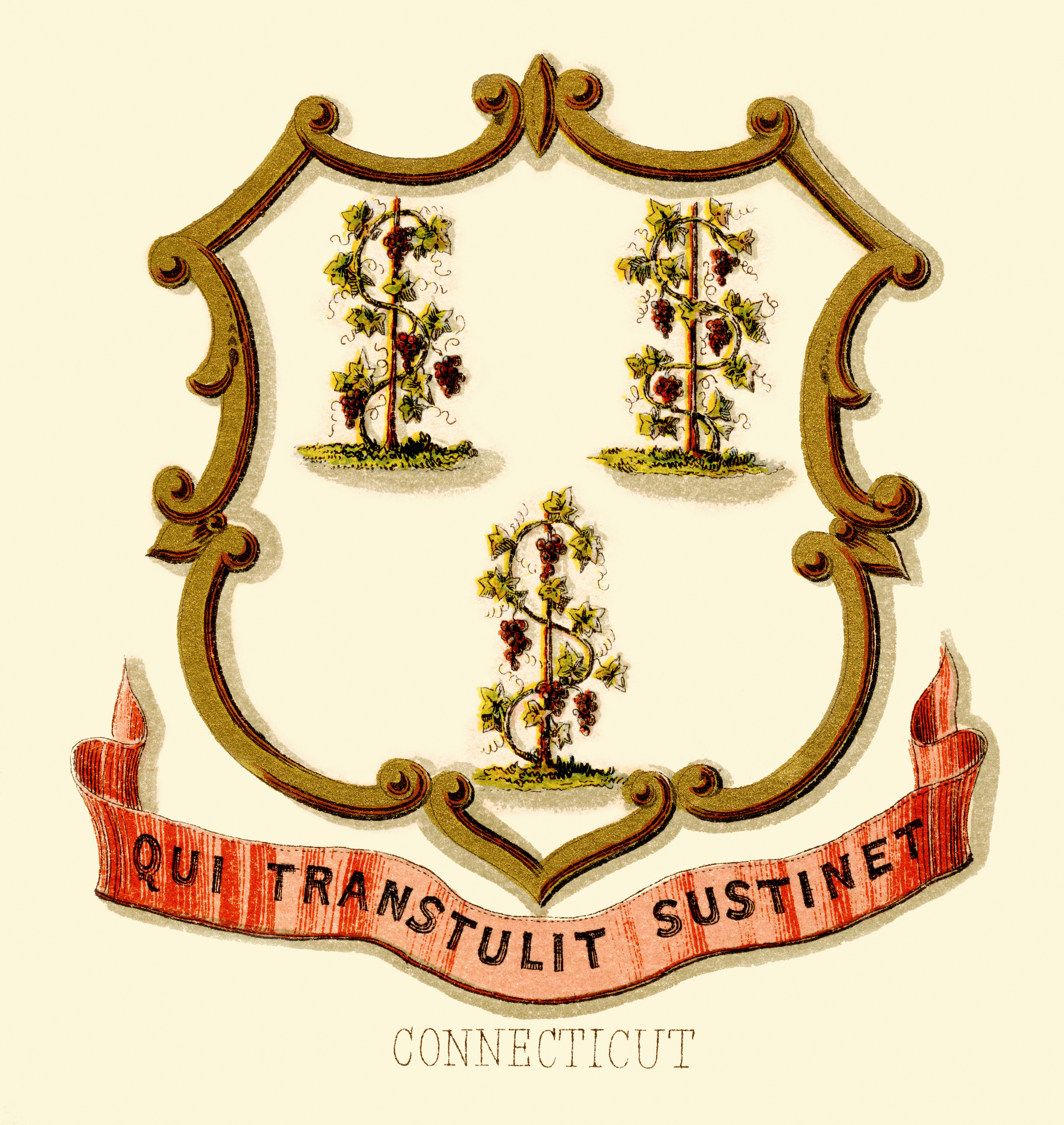
Connecticut historical coat of arms, illustrated by the American engraver Henry Mitchell in State Arms of the Union, published in 1876 by Louis Prang.

The current motto differs slightly from the 1639 version (c.f. Sustinet qui transtulit). It was first seen in the colonies in 1639 on a seal brought from England by Colonel George Fenwick. The meaning of the motto was explained on April 23, 1775 in a letter stamped in Wethersfield, Connecticut: "We fix on our Standards and Drums the Colony arms, with the motto, Qui Transtulit Sustinet, round it in letters of gold, which we construe thus: God, who transplanted us hither, will support us". In 1889, State Librarian Charles J. Hoadly published an article, "The Public Seal of Connecticut" that indicated the 80th Psalm as a possible source. The article stated:

"The vines [on the State Seal] symbolize the Colony brought over and planted here in the wilderness. We read in the 80th Psalm: 'Thou hast brought a vine out of Egypt: Thou hast cast out the heathen, and planted it" – in Latin, 'Vineam de Aegypto transtulisti, ejicisti gentes et plantasti eam'; and the motto expresses our belief that He who brought over the vine continues to take care of it – Qui transtulit sustinet".

== Grapevines ==
The grapevines are said to represent more specifically either early towns or the early individual colonies. Some 19th-century versions of the Connecticut Great Seal show several grapevines. The best answer today is that the grapevines should be taken to represent the three original colonies of Connecticut: (Hartford), Quinnipiac (New-Haven), and Saybrook, though it can also represent the first three settlements of the Connecticut colony proper- Windsor, Hartford, and Wethersfield, as New Haven and Saybrook were reluctant additions to Connecticut.

== Seal of the governor ==
There is also a seal of the governor of Connecticut. Unlike the state seal however, it uses the coat of arms of Connecticut as its central motif.

Seal of the governor of Connecticut

Seal of the lieutenant governor of Connecticut

Seal of the Connecticut State Senate

Seal of the Connecticut Department of Transportation

== See also ==
- List of Connecticut state symbols
