= Seal of Wisconsin =

Official government emblem of the U.S. state of Wisconsin

Great Seal of the State of Wisconsin

Versions
- Coat of arms of Wisconsin

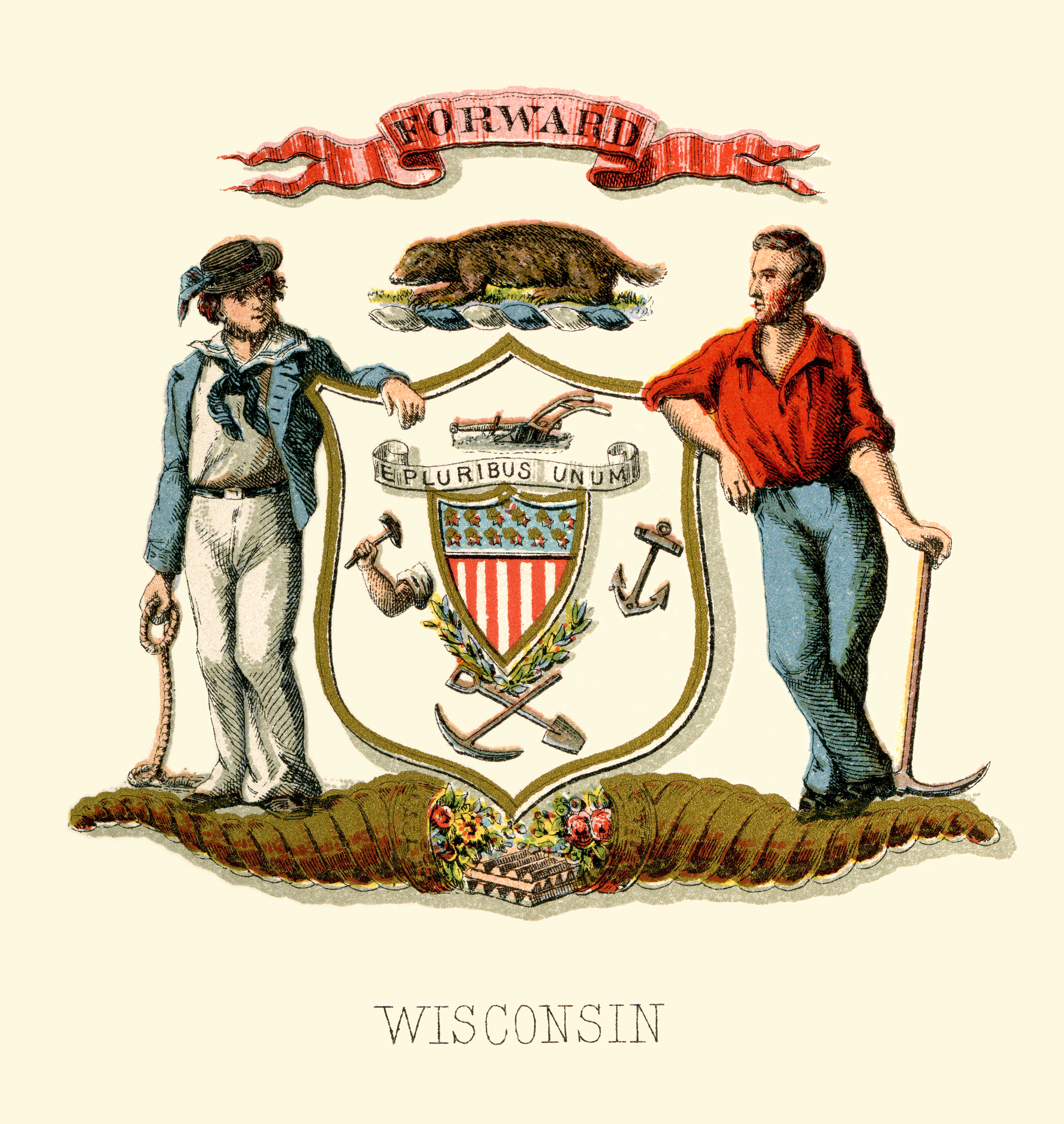
- Historical coat of arms (illustrated, 1876)

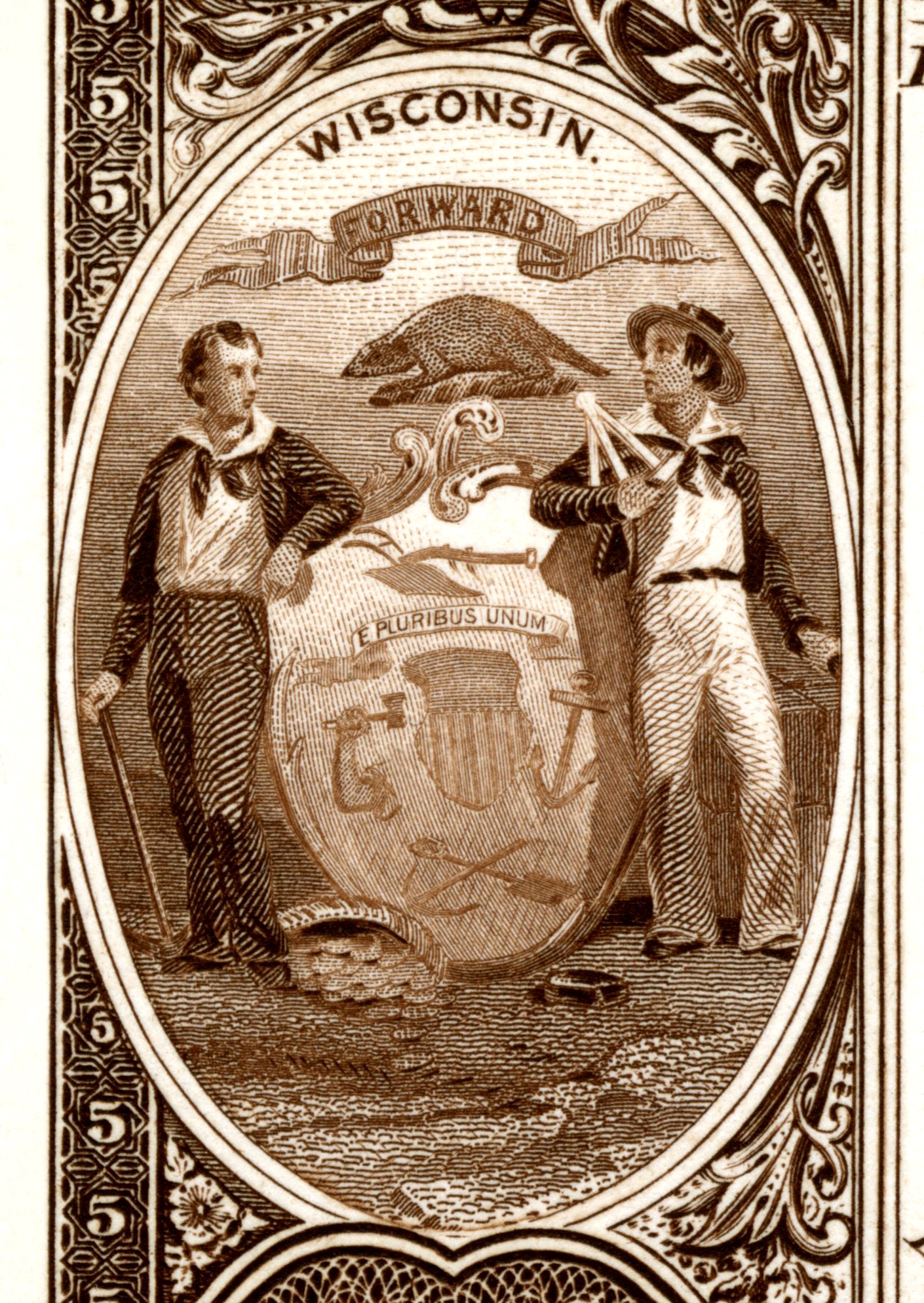
- Wisconsin state seal (first type) depicted on the reverse of Series 1882BB National Bank Note (1851)
- Armiger: State of Wisconsin
- Adopted: 1848 (updated 1851 and 1881)
- Motto: Forward

The great seal of the state of Wisconsin is a seal used by the Wisconsin secretary of state to authenticate all the governor's official acts, except laws.

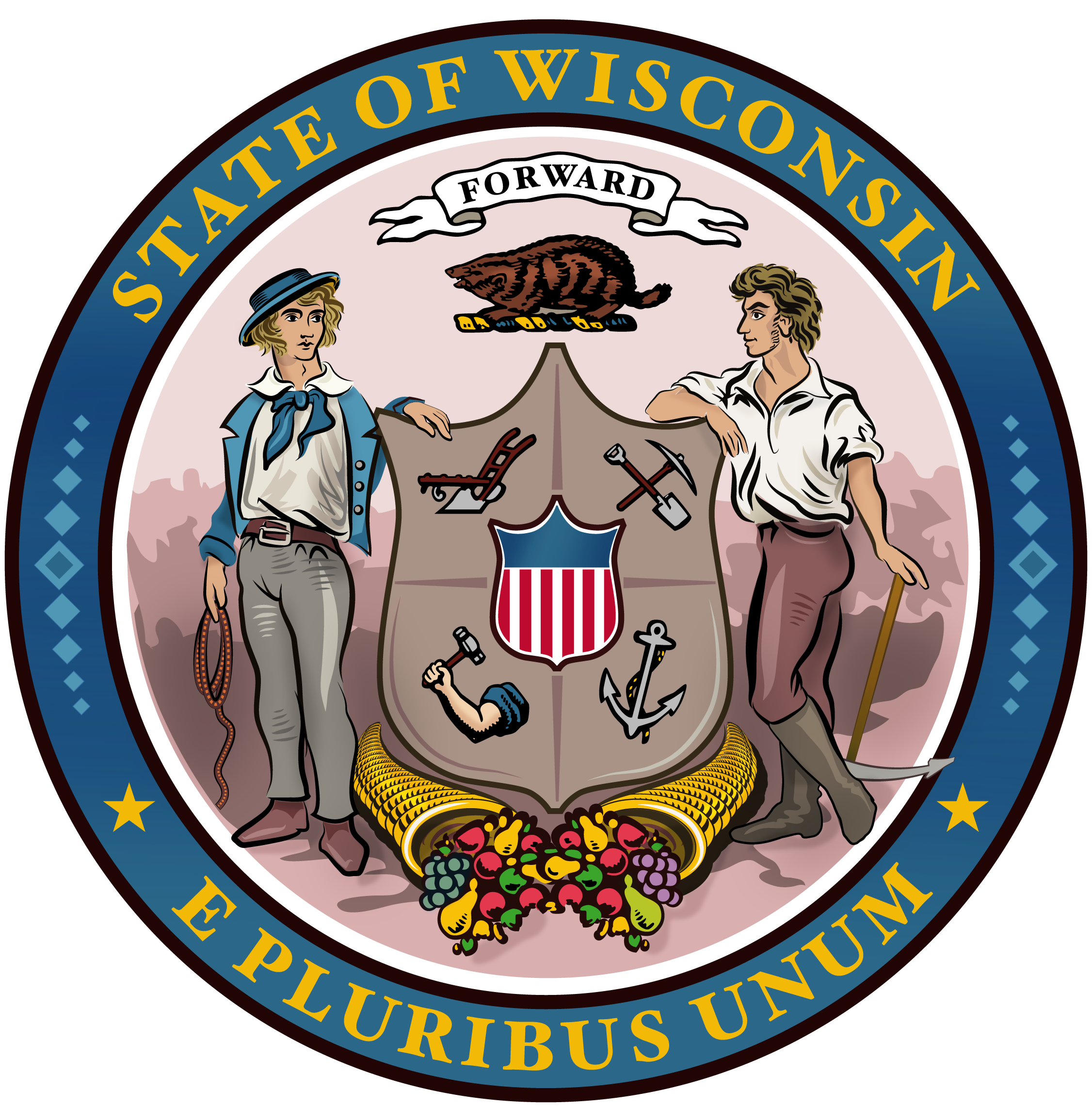
Seal of Wisconsin (1851-1881)

== Design ==
It consists of the state coat of arms, with the words "Great Seal of the State of Wisconsin" above it and 13 stars, representing the original states, below it.

- Top:
  - Forward, the state motto
  - A badger, the state animal
- Center:
  - Top left: A plow, representing agriculture and farming
  - Top right: A pick and shovel, representing mining
  - Bottom left: An arm-and-hammer, representing manufacturing
  - Bottom right: An anchor, representing navigation
  - Center: The U.S. coat of arms, including the motto E pluribus unum
  - The shield is supported by a sailor and a miner, representing labor on water and land
- Bottom:
  - A cornucopia, representing prosperity and abundance
  - 13 lead ingots, representing mineral wealth and the 13 original United States

The state seal emphasizes mining and shipping because at the time of Wisconsin's founding in 1848 the mining of lead and iron and shipping (via the Great Lakes and the Mississippi River) were major industries.

The secretary of state of Wisconsin is the keeper of Wisconsin's great seal. The seal is displayed in all courtrooms in the state, often alongside the county seal.

== History ==
The first seal of Wisconsin was developed in 1836, when the Wisconsin Territory was organized. Designed by engraver William Wagner, the territorial rendition of the seal depicted a white farmer on a field, in the foreground, with a displaced Native American holding a bow further back; it also depicted a steamboat (in the Mississippi River) and a schooner. It also rendered a future state capitol building of Wisconsin, which was not used when the Wisconsin State Capitol was designed and constructed.

Across the top of the seal was the phrase Civilitas Successitt Barbarum (Latin for "civilization succeeds barbarism", referring to the Native American populations), and the date "Fourth of July 1836" at the bottom.

A revision occurred in 1839, with a new seal being developed from 1848, when Wisconsin achieved statehood, until being ratified in 1851, and was officially named the "Great Seal of Wisconsin" from that point on. It was last redesigned in 1881.

== Government seals of Wisconsin ==
Executive Privy Seal of Wisconsin

Seal of the Wisconsin Department of Corrections

Seal of the Wisconsin Department of Transportation

Seal of the Wisconsin Supreme Court

== Gallery ==
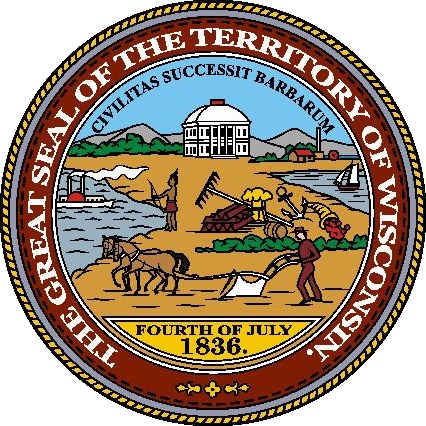
Wisconsin territorial seal, used from 1839 to 1848 and by the new State of Wisconsin from 1848 to 1849.

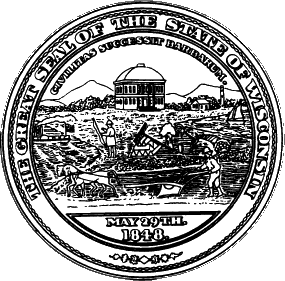
The first Wisconsin state seal, used from 1849 to 1851.

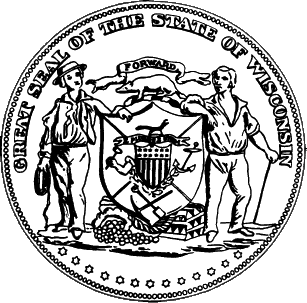
The second Wisconsin state seal, used from 1851 to 1881.

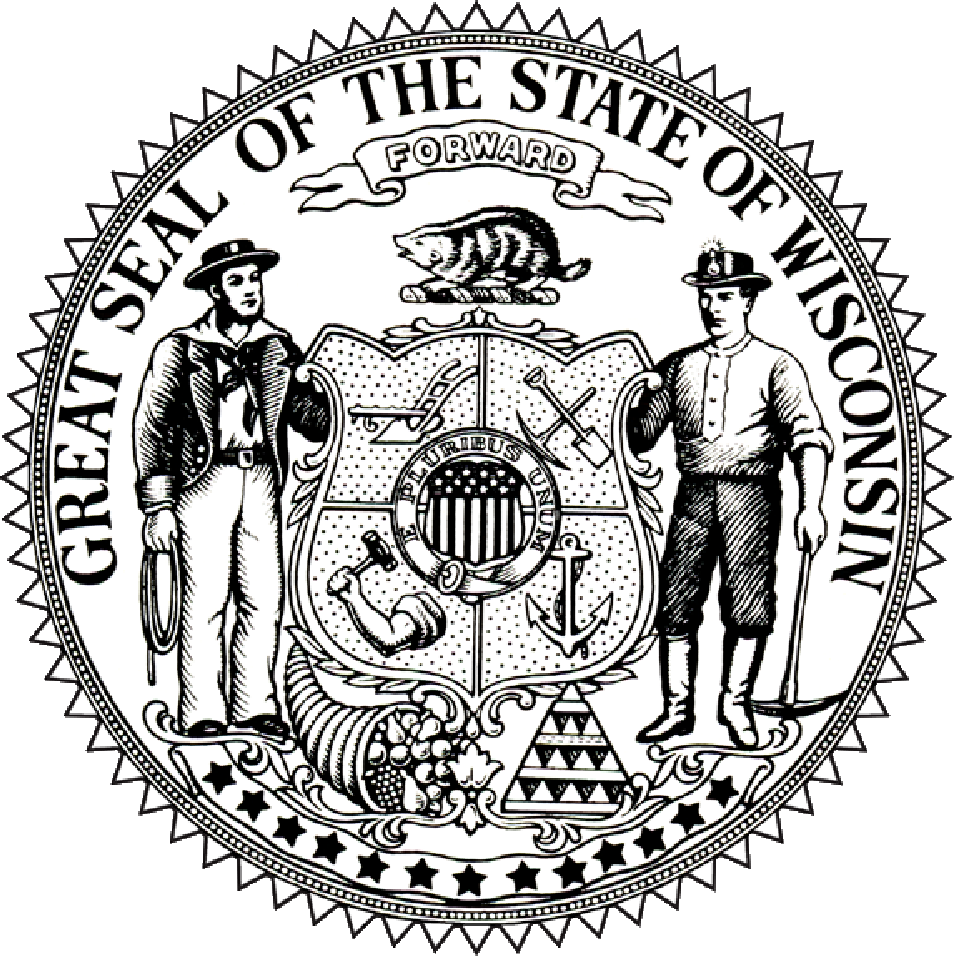
The current state seal of Wisconsin, adopted in 1881.

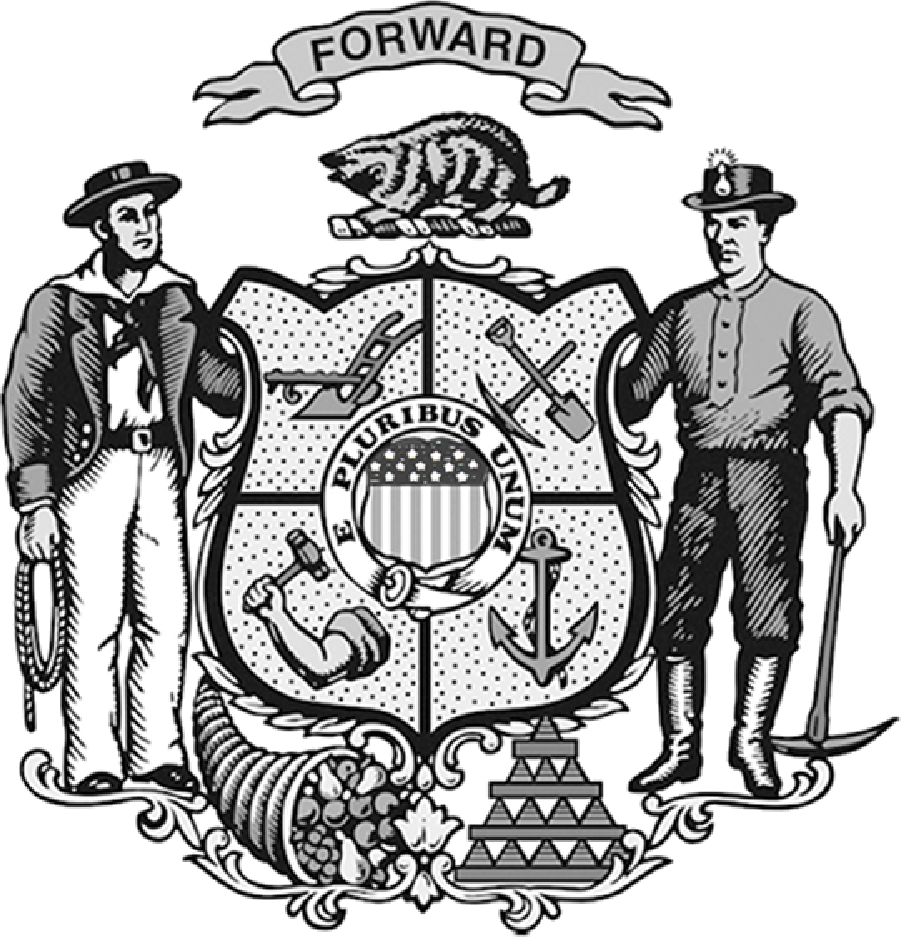
The current coat of arms of Wisconsin, adopted in 1881.

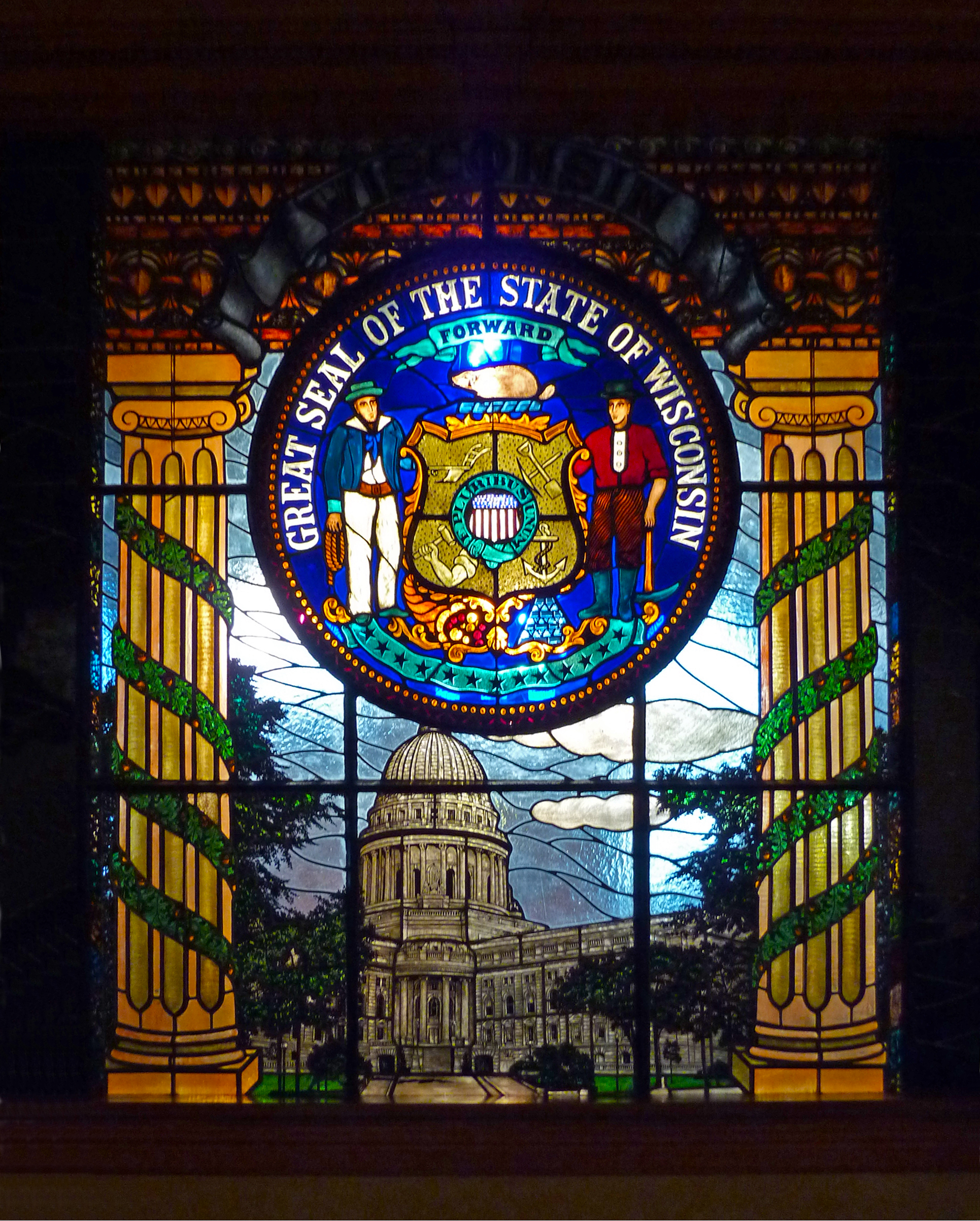
Decorative glass pane in Milwaukee City Hall, containing the seal

== See also ==
- Symbols of the State of Wisconsin
- Flag of Wisconsin
