= List of Connecticut state symbols =

Location of the state of Connecticut in the United States of America

The state of Connecticut has adopted numerous symbols, which are found in Chapter 33, Sections 3.105–110 of the General Statutes of Connecticut, and are listed in the Connecticut State Register and Manual.

== Insignia ==
Type	Symbol	Year	Image
Coat of arms	The Coat of arms of Connecticut	1931	
Flag	White shield with three grapevines on a field of azure blue, with a banner below the shield depicting the state motto.	1897	Flag of Connecticut
Motto	Qui Transtulit Sustinet (He Who Transplanted Still Sustains)	1897	—
Seal	The Great seal of the state of Connecticut	1784	Connecticut state seal

== Flora ==
Type	Symbol	Year	Image
Children's state flower	Michaela Petit's Four-O’Clocks (Mirabilis jalapa)	2015	Mountain laurel
Flower	Mountain laurel (Kalmia latifolia)	1907	Mountain laurel
Tree	Charter Oak (White oak Quercus alba)	1947	Charter Oak

== Fauna ==
Type	Symbol	Year	Image
Bird	American robin (Turdus migratorius)	1943	American Robin
Dog	Siberian Husky	2024	Siberian Husky
Dinosaur	Dilophosaurus	2017	Dilophosaurus
Fish	American shad (Alosa sapidissima)	2003	American Shad
Insect	European mantis, or praying mantis (Mantis religiosa)	1977	European Mantis
Animal	Sperm whale (Physeter macrocephalus)	1975	Sperm whale
Shellfish	Eastern oyster (Crassostrea virginica)	1989	Eastern Oyster

== Geology ==
Type	Symbol	Year	Image
Fossil	Eubrontes giganteus	1991	Eubrontes
Mineral	Garnet (Almandine garnet)	1977	Garnet

== Culture ==
Type	Symbol	Year	Image
Aircraft	F4U Corsair	2005	F4U Corsair
Pioneering aircraft	Gustave Whitehead's No. 21	2017	No. 21
Candy	Lollipop	2024	Orange lollipop
Cantata	"The Nutmeg"	2003	
Composer	Charles Ives (Note: Jacob Druckman was named State Composer Laureate in 1993; he died in 1996.)	1991	Charles Ives
Flagship and Tall Ship Ambassador	Freedom Schooner Amistad	2003	Freedom Schooner Amistad
Folk Dance	Square Dance	1995	Square Dance
Food	Pizza	2021	Pizza
Hero	Nathan Hale	1985	Nathan Hale
Heroine	Prudence Crandall	1995	Prudence Crandall
Poet Laureate	Poet Laureate of Connecticut	1985	
Polka	Ballroom polka	2013	
Ship	USS Nautilus (SSN-571)	1983	USS Nautilus
Song	Yankee Doodle	1978	Yankee Doodle
Second song	Beautiful Connecticut Waltz	2013	
Tartan	Connecticut state tartan	1995	
Troubadour	Connecticut State Troubadour	1991	

== See also ==
- List of Connecticut-related topics
- Lists of United States state insignia
- State of Connecticut
