= William Houston =

American Founding Father and politician

William Churchill Houston (c. 1746 – August 12, 1788), a Founding Father of the United States, was a teacher, lawyer and statesman. Houston served as a delegate representing New Jersey in both the Continental Congress and Constitutional Convention. He was elected to the American Philosophical Society in 1780.

== Early life and career ==
Houston was born in the Sumter District of central South Carolina. His parents, Archibald and Margaret Houston, were farmers who had emigrated to the then British colony from Ireland. He studied at the Poplar Tent Academy before attending the College of New Jersey (later Princeton University), where he taught grammar school on the side to fund his studies. After his graduation in 1768 he stayed on as a tutor and became a professor of Mathematics and Natural Philosophy (science) in 1771. He married Jane Smith and together they had five children. It was probably Houston's connection with the college and John Witherspoon that drew him into politics as the Revolution approached. John Adams, who met him in 1774, applauded him as among the Sons of Liberty, and in the winter of 1775, he had traveled to Boston, possibly for the Continental Congress. In February 1776, the New Jersey Council of Safety recorded his election as an officer in the Somerset County militia; he resigned that summer, to return to the college, but apparently took up his commission again in the fall, when British forces moved on Princeton, and may have seen active combat during the winter campaigns in central New Jersey.

== American Revolution ==
=== Militia ===
When British forces occupied Princeton in 1776 at the outset of the Revolution the college was closed and the students and professors returned home. Houston then joined with the militia of nearby Somerset County and saw action in the area. He was later elected Captain of one of their companies. When the British withdrew from New Jersey in 1777 and the college reopened, he returned to his teaching post. Houston's most significant contributions to rebellion came not as a soldier, however, but as public official in New Jersey and in the revolutionary confederation government. In March 1777 he was elected to the position of Deputy Secretary of the Continental Congress, serving under Charles Thomson, and continued in the post until September, when Somerset County sent him to the New Jersey General Assembly as one of its three representatives. He remained active in the Assembly, gradually gaining greater and greater committee responsibilities, until May 1779, when he and Abraham Clark were elected as New Jersey representatives to the Continental Congress (replacing Frederick Frelinghuysen and Elias Dayton). He played a particularly active role in Congress through July 1781, when he became seriously ill, and then served intermittently, through the winter of 1785.

=== Continental Congress and legal career ===
He was elected to represent Somerset County in the New Jersey General Assembly in 1777. In 1778 he served on the state's Committee of Safety. Then from 1779 to 1781 New Jersey sent him as a delegate to the Continental Congress. His work in Congress was largely directed to issues of finance and supply. He began to study law under Richard Stockton and was admitted to the bar in April 1781.

He returned to the college and also opened a law office in Trenton. During these years he was named as clerk of the New Jersey Supreme Court. In 1783, he resigned from the college to devote himself to his legal career. He returned to the Continental Congress in 1784 and 1785.

=== Constitutional Convention delegate ===
In 1786 Houston was appointed to a commission to study the defects in the Articles of Confederation which joined the states. He went to the Annapolis Convention to discuss the problem. Instead of proposing changes to the articles, this Convention called for a full Constitutional Convention. When the United States Constitutional Convention assembled in 1787, he went to Philadelphia, and Pennsylvania as a delegate. Houston only remained at the convention for a week before his failing health caused him to withdraw.

== Death ==
Houston died of tuberculosis the following year in Frankford, Pennsylvania (now part of Philadelphia) and was buried at the Second Presbyterian Church Cemetery in Philadelphia. Later, he was reburied at the Mount Vernon Cemetery in Philadelphia.
