= Alfred Jones (engraver) =

English-born American engraver

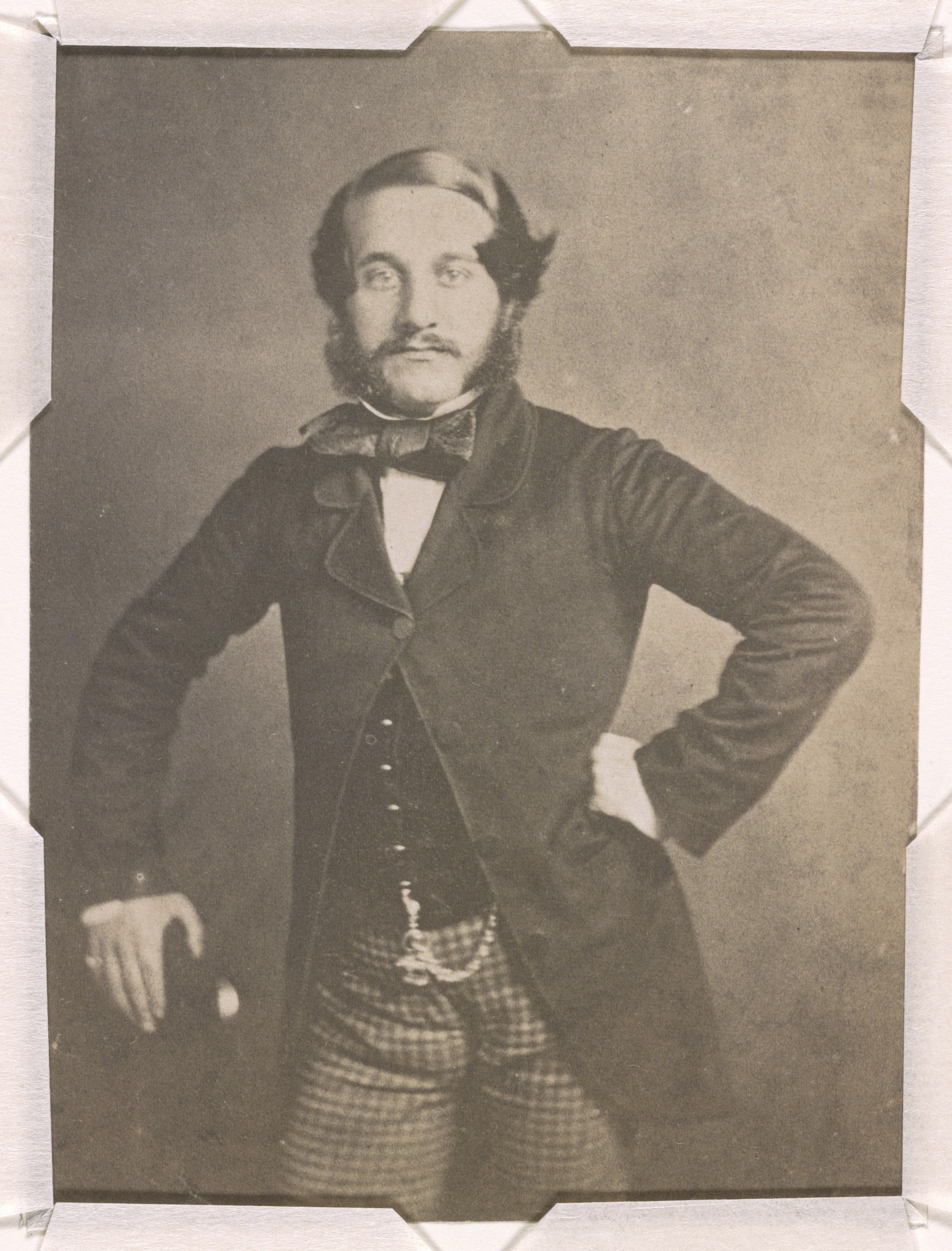
Alfred Jones

Alfred Jones (c. 1819 in Liverpool, England – 1900 in New York City) was an American engraver. He also made portrait and landscape paintings. In the 1890s he was employed at the American Bank Note Company in New York. He was the artist and engraver of the 1890 Postage stamp that honored Thomas Jefferson.

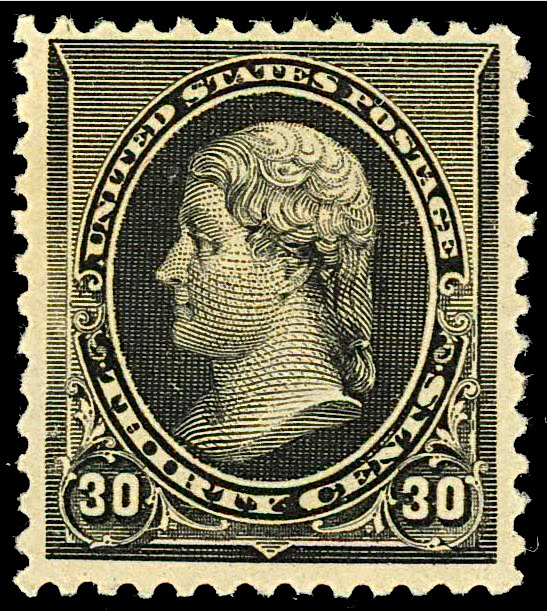
Issue of 1890

== Sources ==
The American Artists Bluebook
