= Organic act =

Act of Congress establishing a US territory

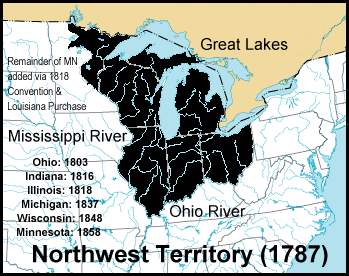
Northwest Territory of the United States, 1787

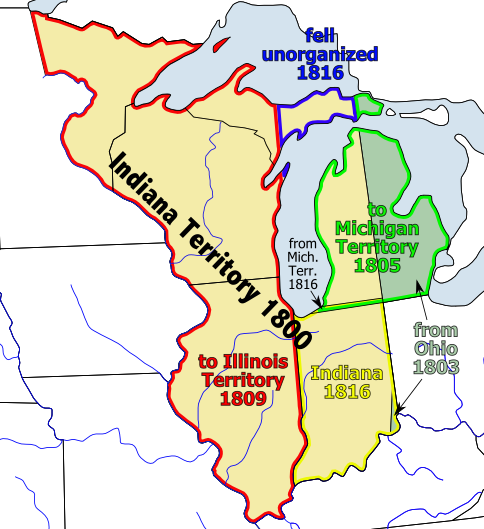
A map of Indiana Territory

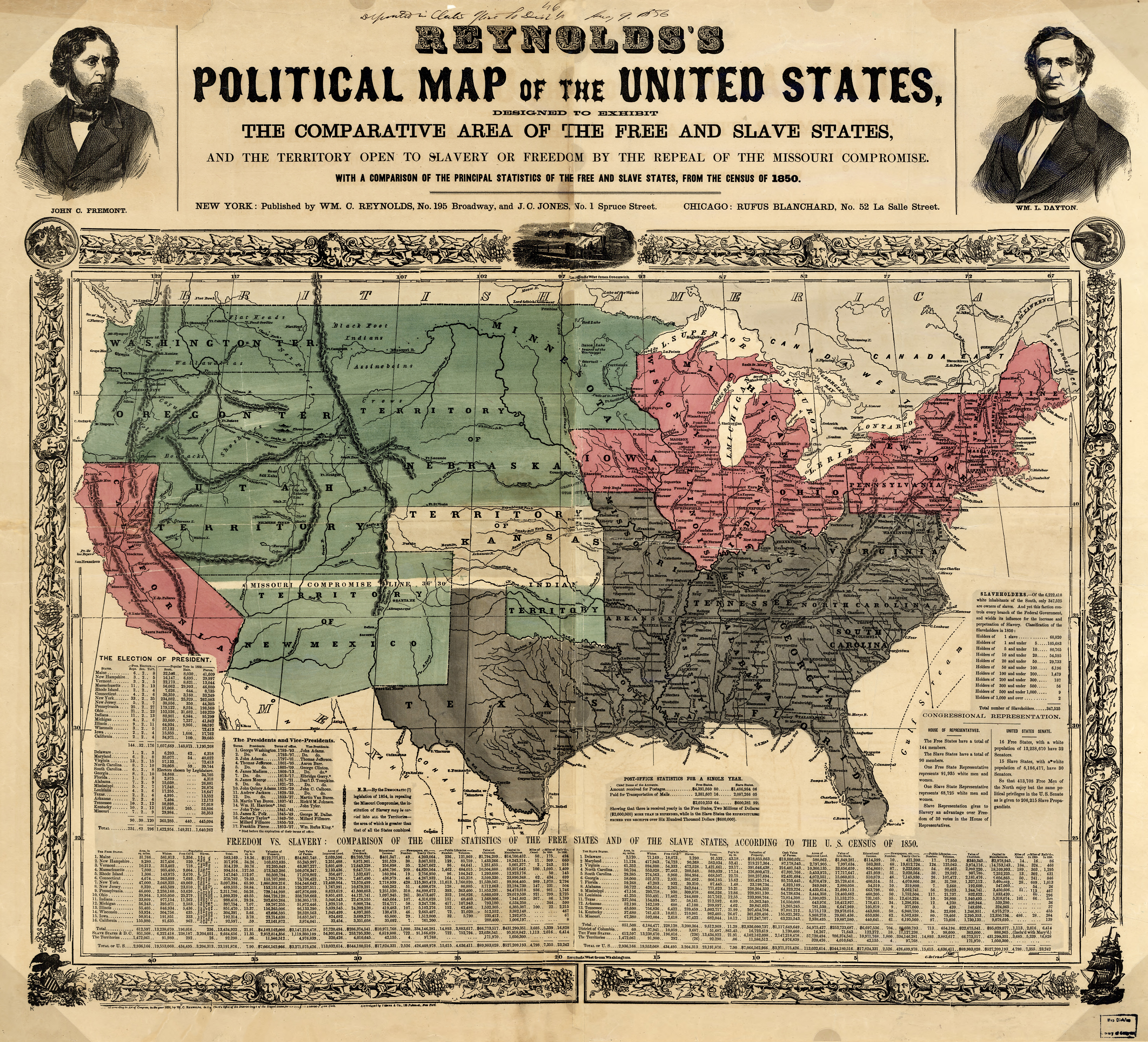
This 1856 map shows slave states (gray), free states (pink), U.S. territories (green), and Kansas in center (white).

In United States law, an organic act is an act of the United States Congress that establishes an administrative agency or local government, for example, the laws that established territory of the United States and specified how they are to be governed, or established agency to manage certain federal lands. In the absence of organic law, the body of laws that define and establish a government, a territory is classified as unorganized.

The first such act was the Northwest Ordinance, passed in 1787 by the U.S. Congress of the Confederation (under the Articles of Confederation, predecessor of the United States Constitution). The Northwest Ordinance created the Northwest Territory in the land west of Pennsylvania and northwest of the Ohio River and set the pattern of development that was followed for all subsequent territories. The Northwest Territory covered more than 260,000 square miles and included all of the modern states of Ohio, Indiana, Illinois, Michigan, Wisconsin, and the northeastern part of Minnesota.

The District of Columbia Organic Act of 1801 incorporated Washington, D.C., and placed it under the exclusive control of the United States Congress.

The Organic Act for the Territory of New Mexico was part of the Compromise of 1850, passed September 9, 1850. Primarily concerned with slavery, the act organized New Mexico as a territory, with boundaries including the areas now embraced in New Mexico, Arizona, and southern Colorado.

== List of organic acts ==
Territorial organic acts have included (in chronological order):

- The Northwest Ordinance
- The Indiana Territory Organic Act
- The District of Columbia Organic Act of 1801
- The Organic Act of 1804, with respect to the Territory of Orleans
- The Michigan Territory Organic Act (1805)
- The Illinois Territory Organic Act (1809)
- The Arkansas Territory Organic Act (1819)
- The Oregon Bill of 1848, created the Territory of Oregon
- The Utah Territory Organic Act (1850)
- The New Mexico Territory Organic Act (1850)
- The Kansas–Nebraska Act created Kansas Territory and Nebraska Territory
- The Colorado Organic Act, 1861, created the Territory of Colorado out of eastern Utah Territory, western Kansas Territory, southwestern Nebraska Territory, and a small portion of northeastern New Mexico Territory
- The Nevada Territory Organic Act, 1861
- The Dakota Organic Act of 1861
- The Arizona Organic Act, created the Territory of Arizona in 1863 from western New Mexico Territory
- The Montana Organic Act, created the Territory of Montana in 1864
- The Wyoming Organic Act, created the Territory of Wyoming in 1868
- The District of Columbia Organic Act of 1871, amalgamated Anacostia, Georgetown and Tenley Town to the City of Washington; and consolidated the County of Washington, City of Washington and District of Columbia into one governmental unit
- The Act Establishing Yellowstone National Park (1872)
- The First Organic Act for Alaska, 1884
- The Oklahoma Organic Act of 1889, established the Oklahoma Territory
- The Hawaiian Organic Act, enacted in 1900, established a government for the Territory of Hawaii
- The Foraker Act or Organic Act of 1900, established civilian government in Puerto Rico. It was superseded in 1917 by the Jones–Shafroth Act.
- The Second Organic Act for Alaska, 1912
- The Organic Act of the Virgin Islands of the United States of 1936 (Pub. L. 74–749, 49 Stat. 1807, enacted June 22, 1936) established a government for the U.S. Virgin Islands, replacing previous temporary provisions (Pub. L. 64–389, 39 Stat. 1132, enacted March 3, 1917). It was superseded by the Revised Organic Act of the Virgin Islands of 1954 (Pub. L. 83–517, 68 Stat. 497, enacted July 22, 1954).
- The Guam Organic Act of 1950, codified Guam as an unincorporated territory and established civilian government ending Guam's administration by the U.S. Navy.

The Philippines:

- The Philippine Organic Act, creation of an elected Philippine Assembly.
- The Jones Law, replaced the 1902 act in 1916 and created a fully elected Philippine Legislature.

Others:

- Organic Act of Feb, 10, 1807, founding the Survey of the Coasts (National Ocean Service)
- Organic Act of 1862, establishing the United States Department of Agriculture
- The National Park Service Organic Act, establishing the National Park Service and the National Park System in 1916

== See also ==
- Organic law
- Organic Laws of Oregon of 1843
