= Seals of governors of the U.S. states and territories =

Seals of governors of the U.S. states are the primary symbols of the executive office of the governor in several states of the United States, similar in concept to the seal of the president of the United States and seal of the vice president of the United States. Governors of some states, such as Washington and Oregon, simply use the state seal in their role as chief executive.

Instead of a seal, the state of Hawaii uses a logo for the office of governor and lieutenant governor. This logo follows the design used by the White House logo.

== Seals ==
=== States ===
Seal of the governor-elect of Alabama

Seal of the governor of Alabama

Seal of the lieutenant governor of Alabama

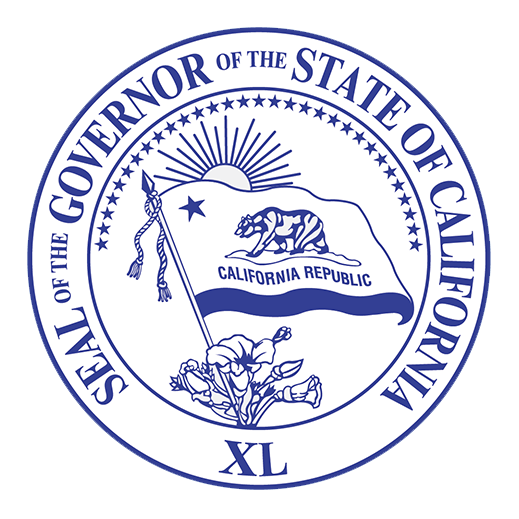
Seal of the governor of California

Seal of the governor of Connecticut

Seal of the lieutenant governor of Connecticut

Seal of the governor of Delaware

Seal of the governor of Maine

Seal of the governor of Massachusetts

Seal of the governor of Michigan

Seal of the governor of Minnesota

Seal of the governor of New Mexico

Privy seal of New York

Seal of the governor of North Carolina

Seal of the governor of North Dakota

Seal of the governor of Ohio

Seal of the lieutenant governor of Ohio

Seal of the governor of Pennsylvania (official)

Seal of the governor of Pennsylvania (variant)

Seal of the governor of Rhode Island

Seal of the lieutenant governor of Rhode Island

Seal of the governor of South Carolina

Seal of the lieutenant governor of South Carolina

Seal of the governor of Texas

Seal of the lieutenant governor of Texas

Seal of the governor of Utah

Seal of the governor of Washington

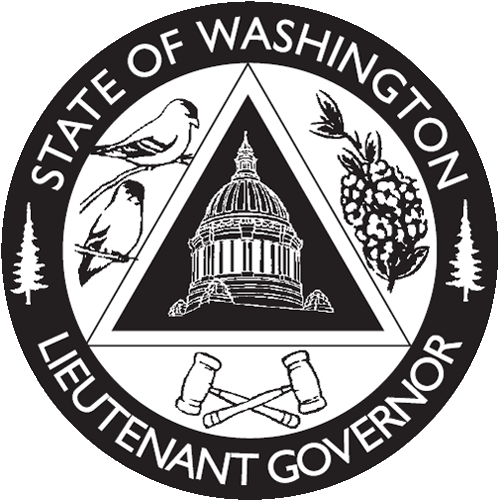
Seal of the lieutenant governor of Washington

Seal of the governor of West Virginia

Privy seal of Wisconsin

Seal of the governor of Wyoming

=== Territories ===
Seal of the Governor of Puerto Rico

== See also ==
- Flags of governors of the U.S. states
- Governor (United States)
- Armorial of the United States
- Seals of the U.S. states
- Seal of the president of the United States
- Seal of the vice president of the United States
