= List of Alabama state symbols =

List of official symbols of the State of Alabama

Location of the state of Alabama in the United States of America

The state of Alabama has a total of 41 official state emblems. The oldest symbol is the Alabama State Bible, from 1853. The most recently designated symbol is the Little Bluestem, Alabama's state native grass, established in 2024.

Alabama does not have an official nickname, although "Heart of Dixie" was strongly promoted by the Alabama Chamber of Commerce in the 1940s and 1950s, and put on state license plates.

== Insignia ==
Type	Symbol	Year	Image
Bible	The Alabama State Bible	1853	
Great Seal	The Seal of Alabama	1876	Alabama seal
Flag	The flag of Alabama	1895	Alabama flag
Coat of arms	The coat of arms of Alabama	1939	Alabama coat of arms
Military Crest	The State Military Crest of Alabama		Alabama Military Crest
Motto	Audemus jura nostra defendere We dare defend our rights	1939	Alabama Motto
Creed	Alabama state creed	1939	
Mascot	Eastern tiger swallowtail	1989	Eastern tiger swallowtail

== Plants ==
Type	Symbol	Year	Image
Flower	Camellia; Camellia japonica L.	1959	Camellia japonica
Fruit	Blackberry; Rubus occidentalis	2004	Blackberry
Legume	Peanut; Arachis hypogaea	2022	Peanut
Native Grass	Little Bluestem; Schizachyrium scoparium	2024	Little Bluestem
Nut	Pecan; Carya illinoinensis	1982	Pecans
Tree	Southern longleaf pine Pinus palustris	1997	Southern longleaf pine
Tree fruit	Peach; Prunus persica	2006	Peaches
Vegetable	Sweet potato Ipomoea batatas	2021	Sweet potatoes
Wildflower	Oak-leaf hydrangea Hydrangea quercifolia Bartr.	1999	Oak-leaf Hydrangea

== Animals ==
Type	Symbol	Year	Image
Agricultural Insect	Queen Honey Bee Apis mellifera	2015	Queen Honey Bee
Amphibian	Red Hills salamander Phaeognathus hubrichti	2000	Red Hills salamander
Bird	Yellowhammer (yellow-shafted flicker); Colaptes auratus	1933	Yellowhammer
Butterfly	Eastern tiger swallowtail Papilio glaucus	1989	Eastern tiger swallowtail
Crustacean	Brown Shrimp Penaeus aztecus	2015	Brown Shrimp
Freshwater fish	Largemouth bass Micropterus salmoides	1975	Largemouth bass
Game bird	Wild turkey Meleagris gallopavo	1980	Wild turkey
Horse	Racking Horse; Equus caballus	1975	
Insect	Monarch butterfly Danaus plexippus	1989	Monarch butterfly
Mammal	American black bear Ursus americanus	2006	Black bear
Marine Mammal	West Indian Manatee Trichechus manatus	2009	West Indian Manatee
Reptile	Alabama red-bellied turtle Pseudemys alabamensis	1990	Alabama red-bellied turtle
Saltwater fish	Atlantic tarpon Megalops atlanticus	1955	Atlantic tarpon

== Geology ==
Type	Symbol	Year	Image
Fossil	Basilosaurus; Basilosaurus cetoides	1984	Basilosaurus cetoides fossil skeleton from Alabama
Gemstone	Star blue quartz	1990	Quartz
Mineral	Hematite	1967	Hematite
Rock	Marble	1969	Marble
Shell	Johnstone's junonia Scaphella junonia johnstoneae	1990	Scaphella junonia
Soil	Bama	1997	Bama soil

== Culture ==
Type	Symbol	Year	Image
Agricultural Museum	Dothan Landmark Park	1992	
American Folk Dance	Square dance	1981	Square dance
Aquarium	Dauphin Island Sea Lab's Alabama Aquarium	2021	
Barbecue Competition	Alabama Barbecue Championship	1991	Barbecue
Cake	Lane cake	2016	Lane cake
Cookie	Yellowhammer cookie	2023	
Historic Theatre	Alabama Theatre	1993	Alabama Theatre
Horse Show	AOHA Alabama State Championship Horse Show	1988	Horse show
Horseshoe Tournament	Stockton Fall Horseshoe Tournament	1992	Horseshoe
Outdoor Drama	The Miracle Worker	1991	Helen Keller
Outdoor Musical Drama	The Incident at Looney's Tavern	1993	
Song	"Alabama"	1931	
Renaissance Faire	Alabama Renaissance Faire	1988	Renaissance faire
Quilt	Pine Burr Quilt	1997	
Spirit	Conecuh Ridge Alabama Fine Whiskey	2004	Spirit

== Other ==
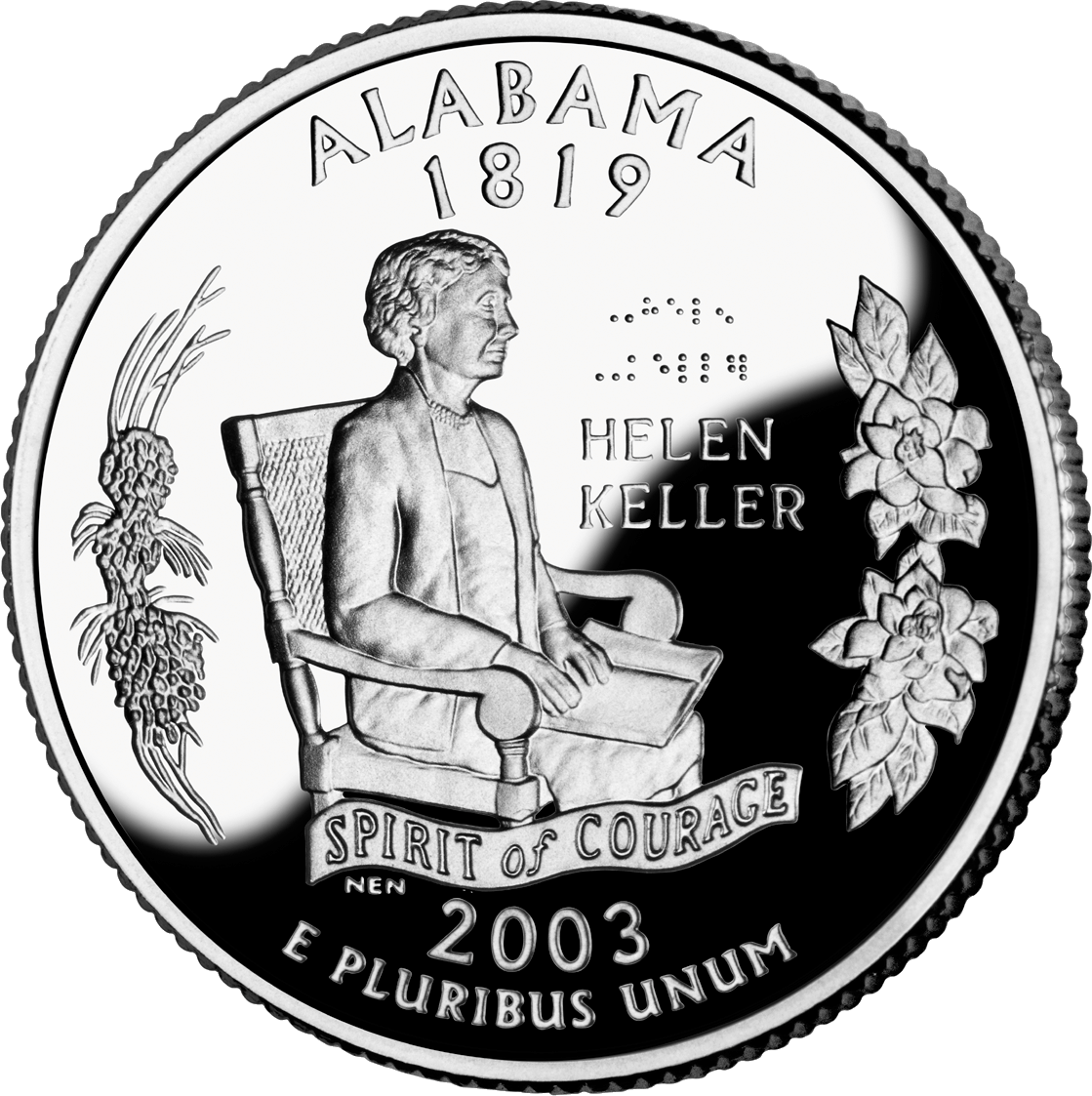
State quarter for Alabama

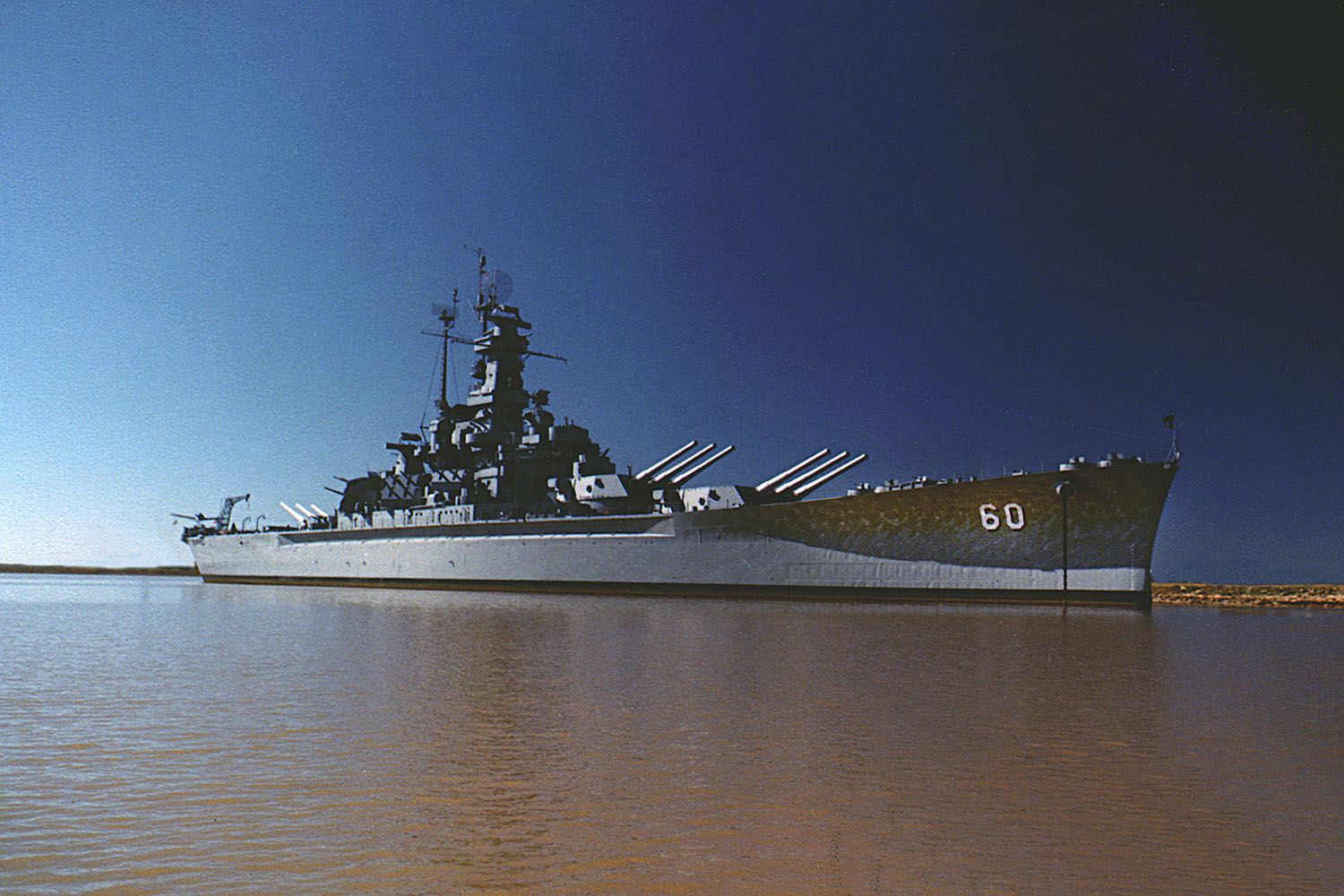
USS Alabama (BB-60)

== See also ==
- List of Alabama-related topics
- Lists of United States state insignia
- State of Alabama
