= List of U.S. state, district, and territorial insignia =

The following table displays the official flag, seal, and coat of arms of the 50 states, of the federal district, the five inhabited territories, and the federal government of the United States of America.

== Table ==
Jurisdiction	Flag	Seal	Coat of arms
Delaware	Details	Details	Details
Pennsylvania	Details	Details	Details
New Jersey	Details	Details	Details
Georgia	Details	Details	—N/a
Connecticut	Details	Details	Details
Massachusetts	Details	Details	Details
Maryland	Details	Details	Details
South Carolina	Details	Details	—N/a
New Hampshire	Details	Details	Details (Note: Not a coat of arms but used on published materials about the states commercial development.)
Virginia	Details	Details	Details
New York	Details	Details	Details
North Carolina	Details	Details	—N/a
Rhode Island	Details	Details	Details
Vermont	Details	Details	Details
Kentucky	Details	Details	—N/a
Tennessee	Details	Details	—N/a
Ohio	Details	Details	Details
Louisiana	Details	Details	—N/a
Indiana	Details	Details	—N/a
Mississippi	Details	Details	Details
Illinois	Details	Details	—N/a
Alabama	Details	Details	Details
Maine	Details	Details	Details
Missouri	Details	Details	Details
Arkansas	Details	Details	—N/a
Michigan	Details	Details	Details
Florida	Details	Details	—N/a
Texas	Details	Details (Note: The reverse side is purely decorative and does not function as a seal, but it defined as such in law.)	Details
Iowa	Details	Details	—N/a
Wisconsin	Details	Details	Details
California	Details	Details	—N/a
Minnesota	Details	Details	—N/a
Oregon	Details	Details	—N/a
Kansas	Details	Details	—N/a
West Virginia	Details	Details	Details
Nevada	Details	Details	—N/a
Nebraska	Details	Details	—N/a
Colorado	Details	Details	Details
North Dakota	Details	Details	Details
South Dakota	Details	Details	—N/a
Montana	Details	Details	—N/a
Washington	Details	Details	—N/a
Idaho	Details	Details	—N/a
Wyoming	Details	Details	—N/a
Utah	Details	Details	Details
Oklahoma	Details	Details	—N/a
New Mexico	Details	Details	—N/a
Arizona	Details	Details	Details
Alaska	Details	Details	—N/a
Hawaii	Details	Details	Details
District of Columbia	Details	Details	Details
American Samoa	Details	Details	—N/a
Guam	Details	Details	—N/a
Northern Mariana Islands	Details	Details	—N/a
Puerto Rico	Details	Details	Details
United States Virgin Islands	Details	Details	—N/a
United States of America	Details	Details	Full Escutcheon Details

== The largest Native American tribes ==
This is not a complete list of federally recognized tribes, and only represents some of the largest by population and reserved land area. See the Wikimedia links above for more symbols of Native American nations.

Common and official names	Flag	Seal
Navajo Nation	Details	Details
Cherokee Nation	Details	Details
Choctaw Nation	Details	Details
Hopi Nation	Details	Details
Haudenosaunee Confederacy	Details	Details
Osage Nation	Details	Details

== Historical seals ==
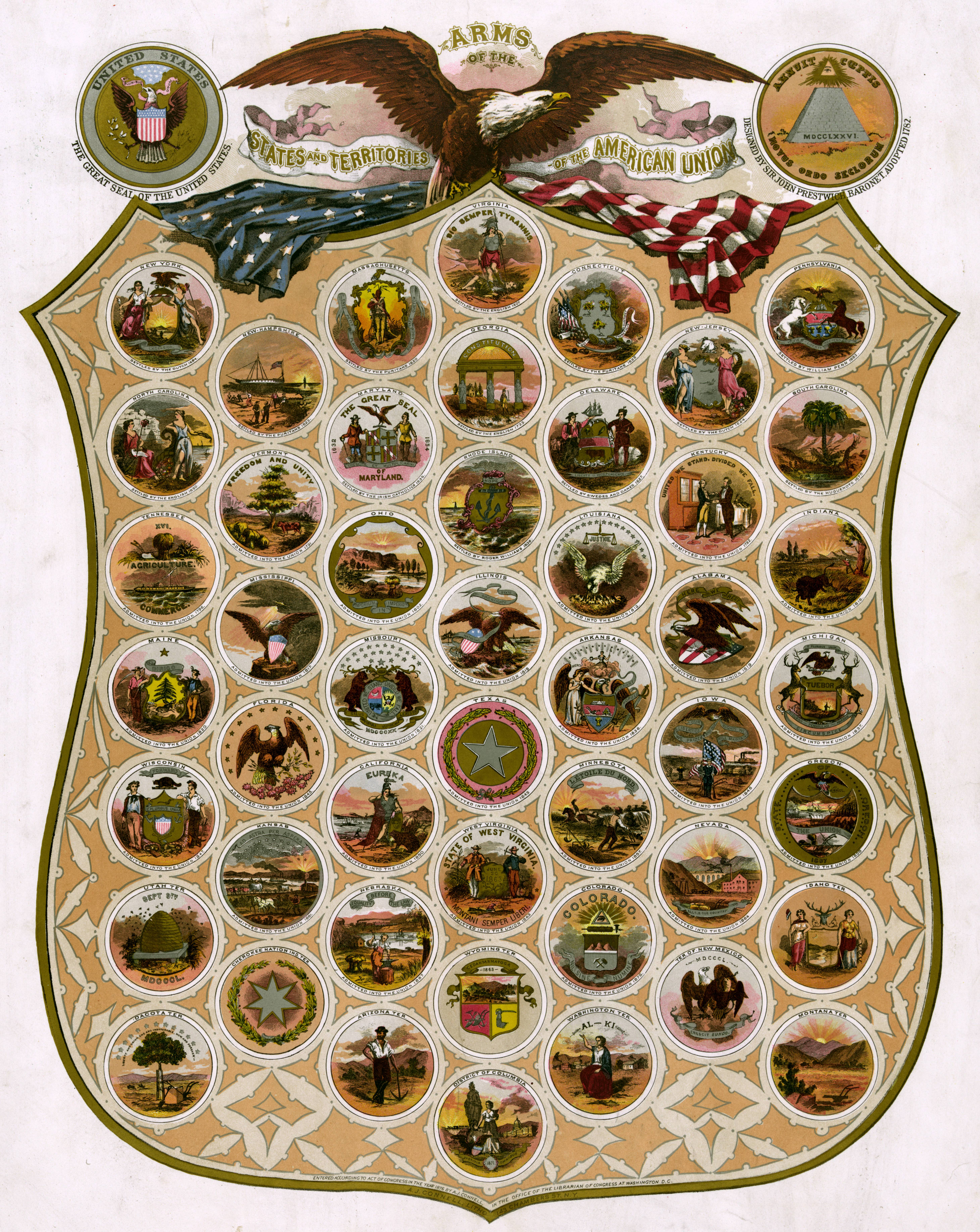
Seals of the U.S. states, territories, and federal district as of 1876

Great Seal of Alabama (1817–1868)

Great Seal of Alabama (1868–1939)

Seal of District of Alaska (1884–1910)

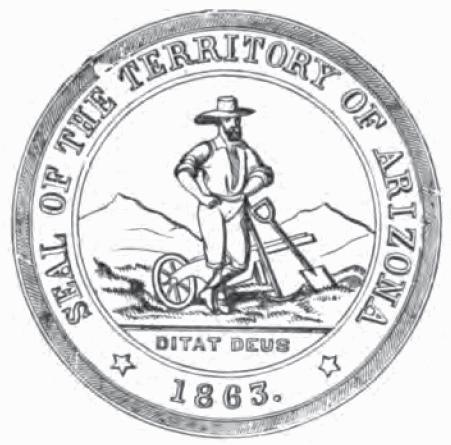
Seal of Territory of Arizona (1864–1890)

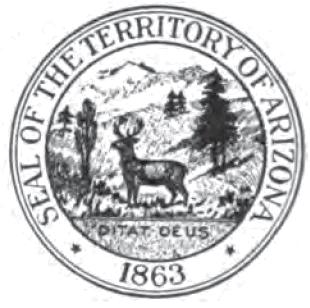
Seal of Territory of Arizona (1890–1912)

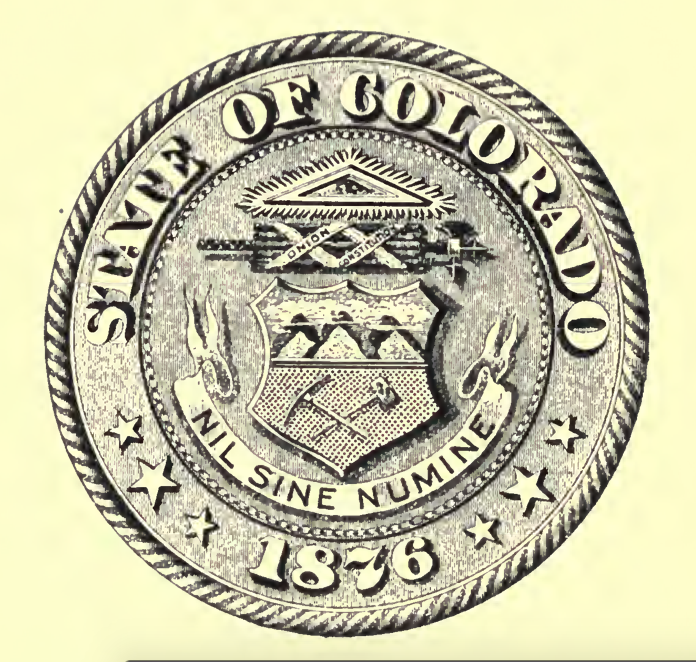
Seal of the State of Colorado (1876)

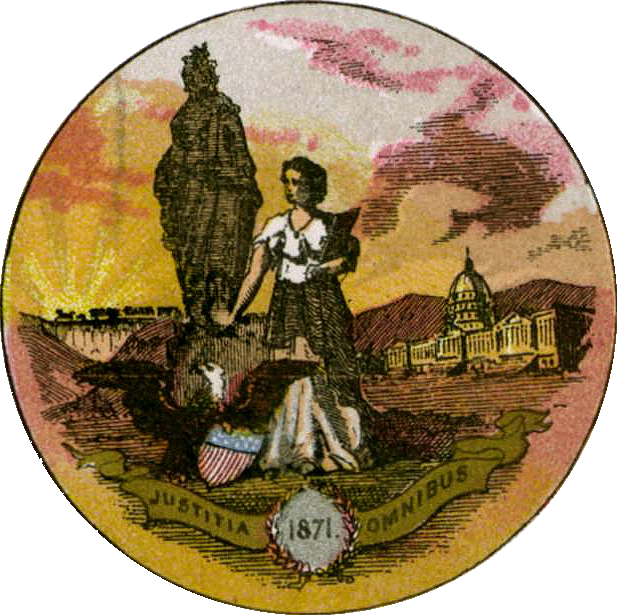
Seal of the District of Columbia (1876)

Great Seal of Florida (1868–1985)

Seal of the Territory of Hawaii (1898–1959)

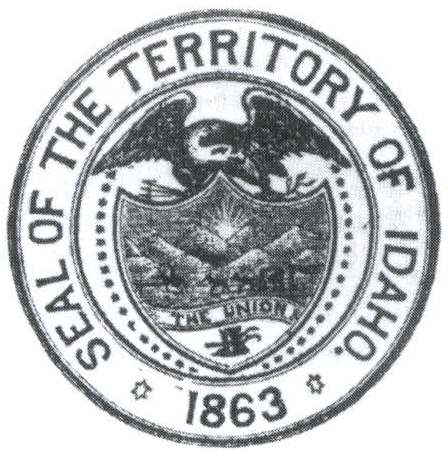
Seal of Idaho Territory (1863–1866)

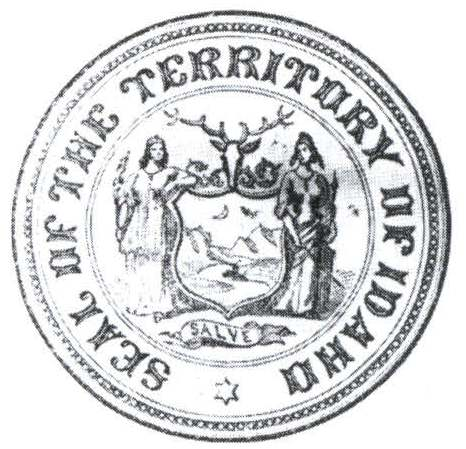
Seal of Idaho Territory (1866–1890)

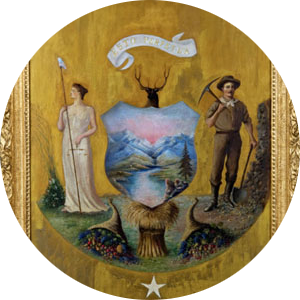
Seal of Idaho (1891—1957)

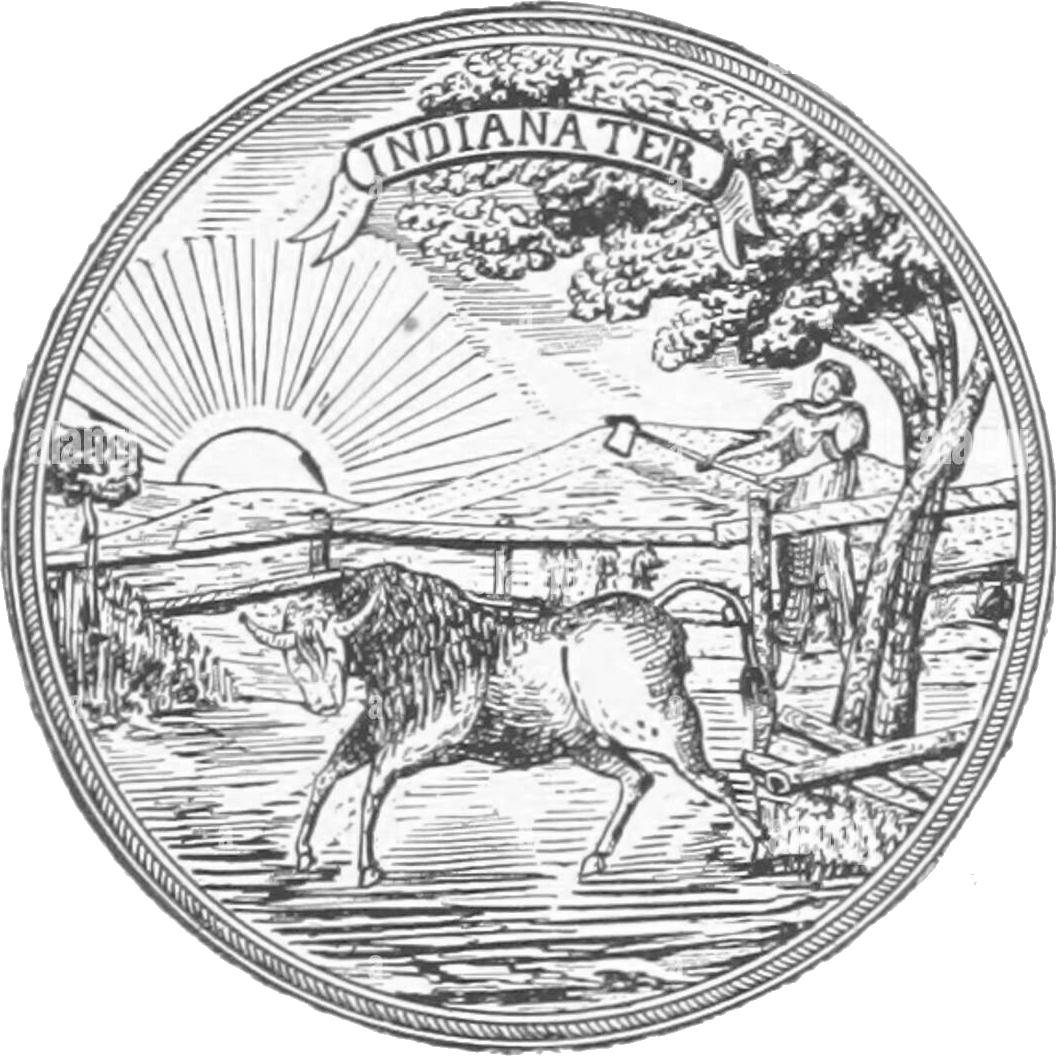
Seal of Indiana (1801–1816)

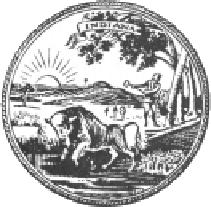
Seal of Indiana (1816–1855)

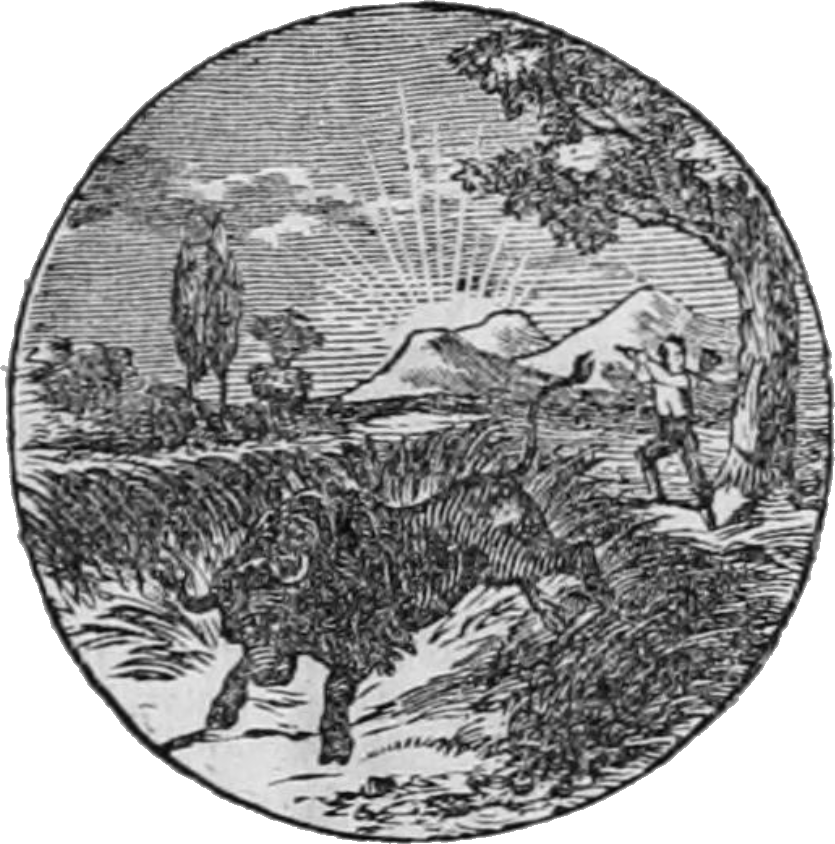
Seal of Indiana (1855–1856)

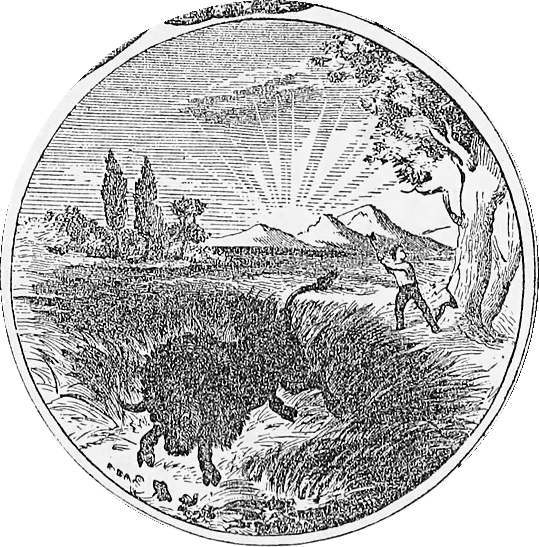
Seal of Indiana (1856–1863)

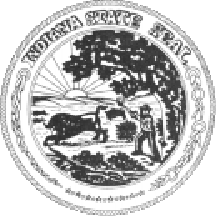
Seal of Indiana (1863–1879)

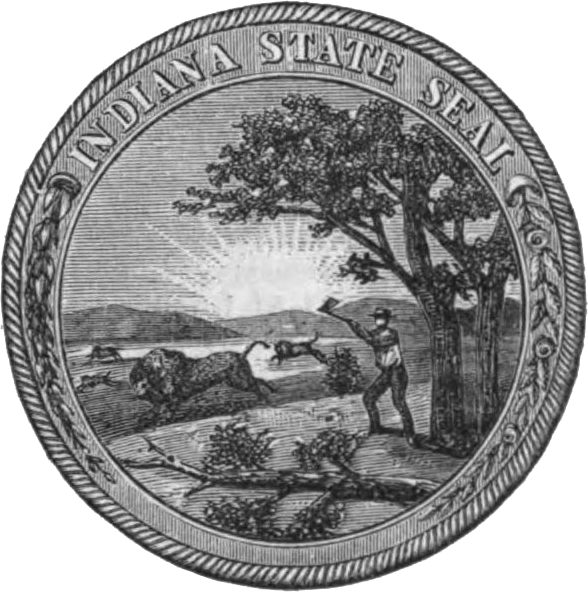
Seal of Indiana (1879–1899)

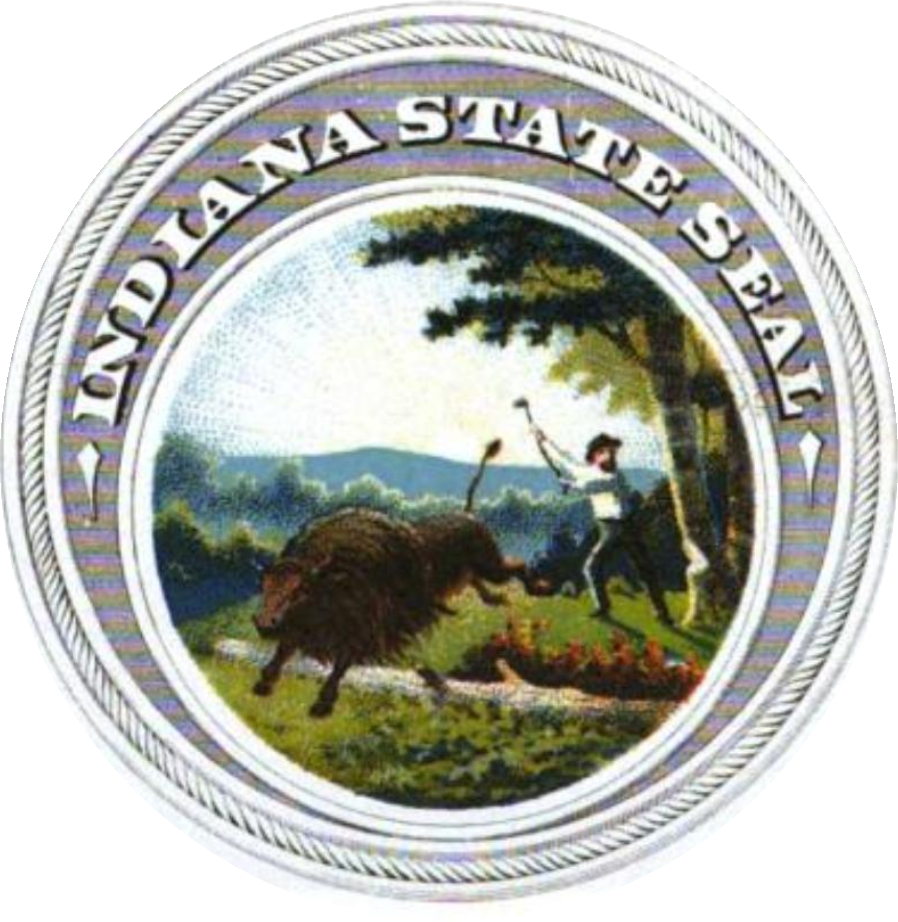
Seal of Indiana (1899–1950)

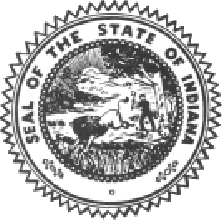
Seal of Indiana (1950–1963)

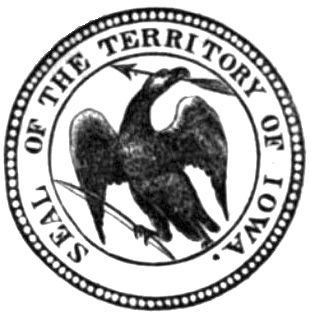
Seal of the Territory of Iowa (1838–1846)

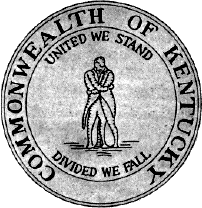
Seal of Kentucky (1793–1812)

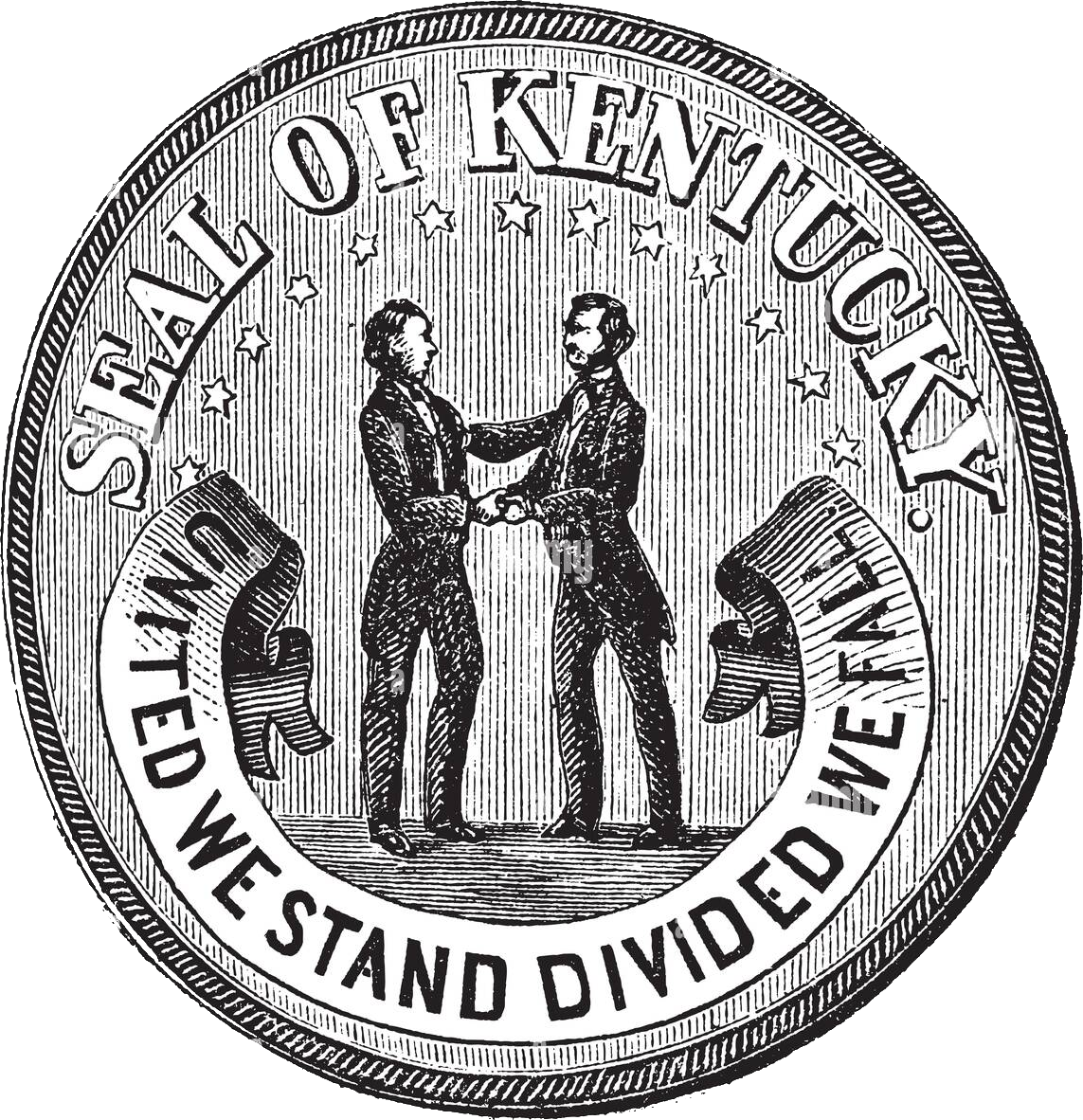
Seal of Kentucky (1812–1884)

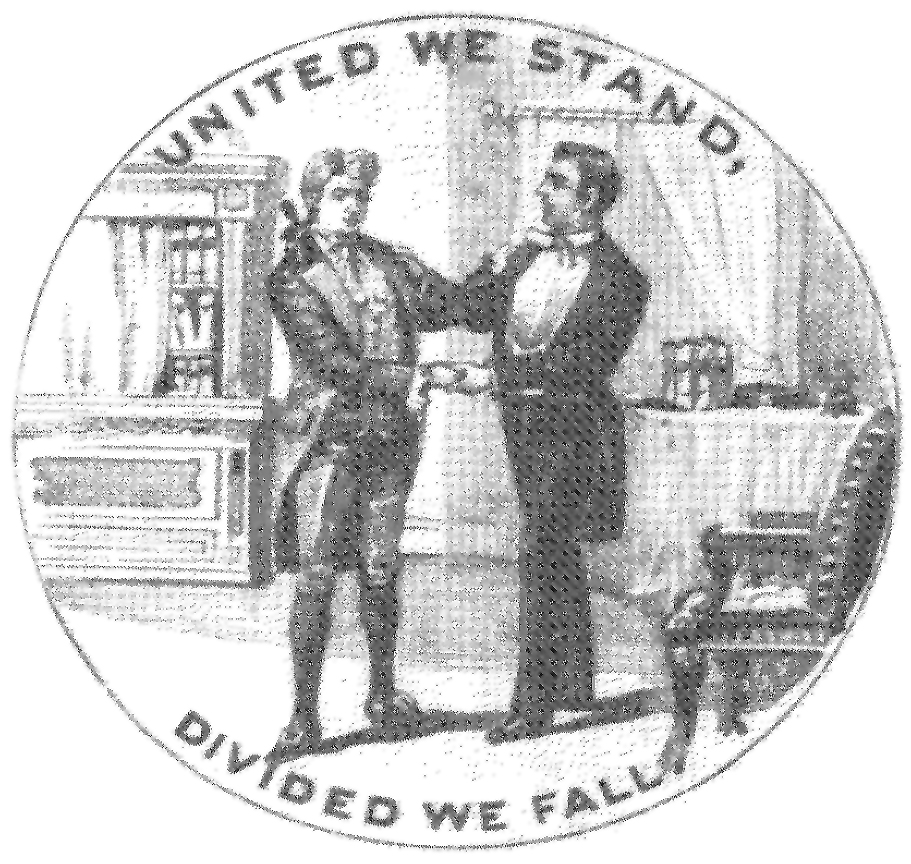
Seal of Kentucky (1884–1900s)

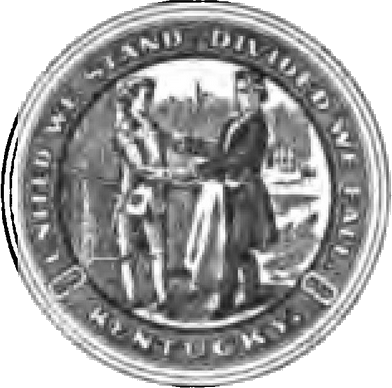
Seal of Kentucky (1900s–1908)

Seal of Kentucky (1911–1923)

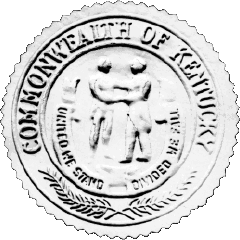
Seal of Kentucky (1923–1936)

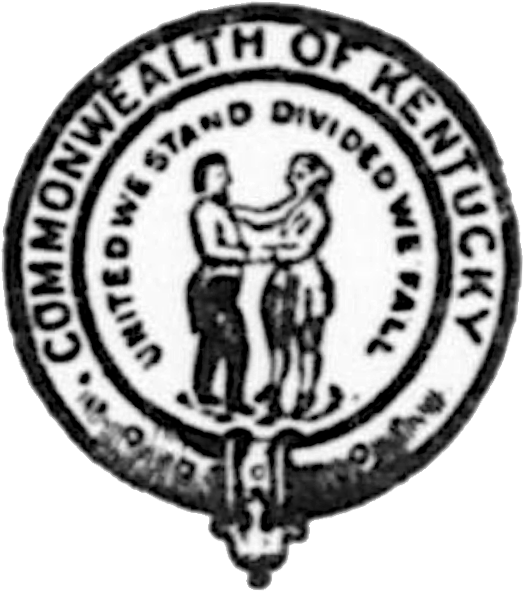
Seal of Kentucky (1936–1962)

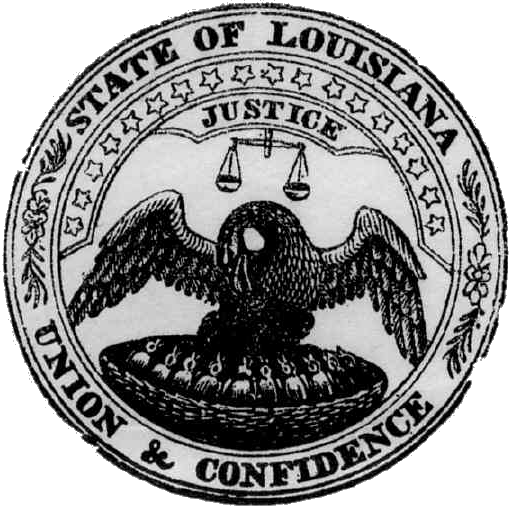
Seal of Louisiana (1802–1876)

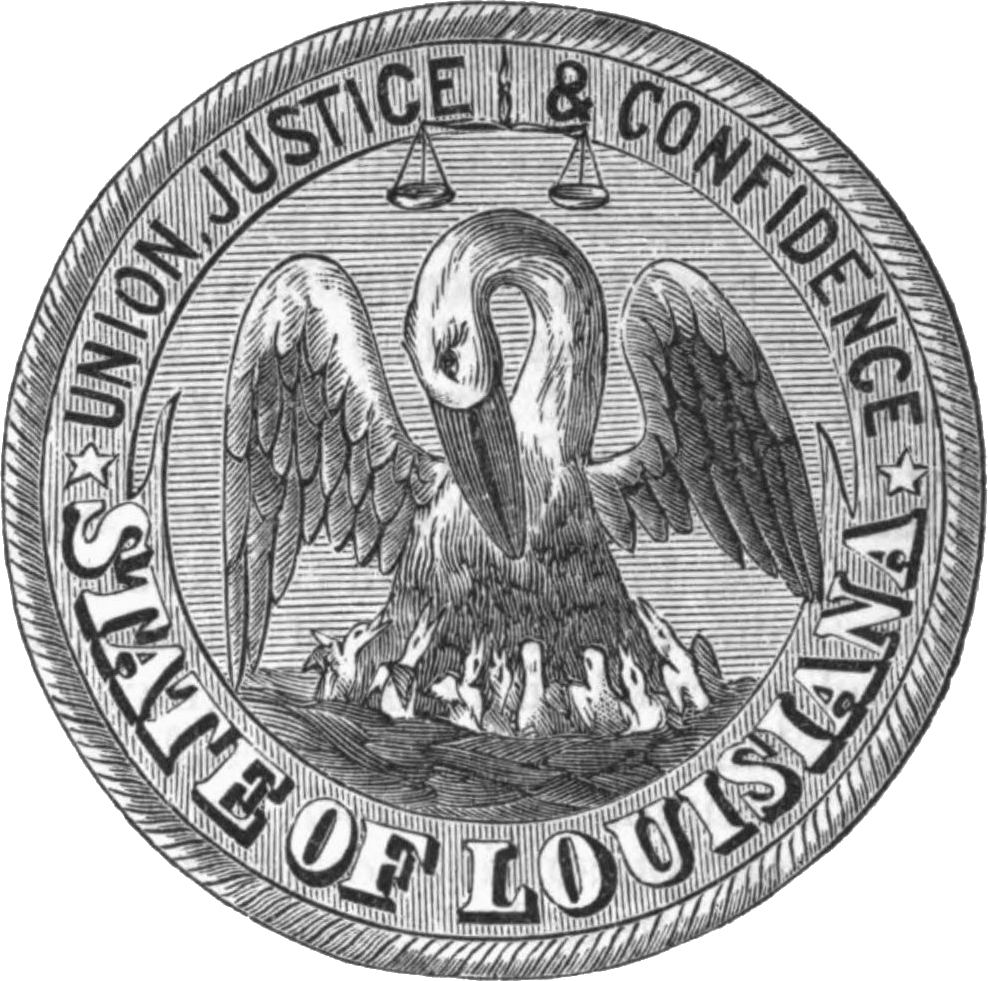
Seal of Louisiana (1802–1879)

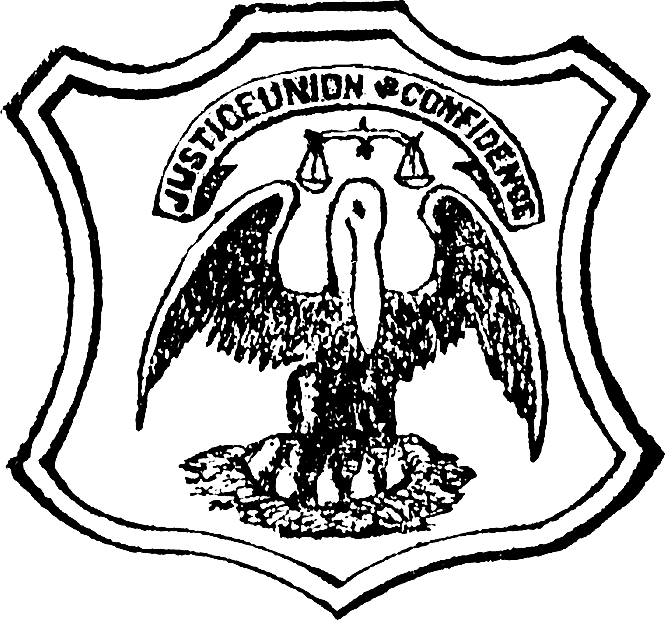
Seal of Louisiana (1879–1890)

Seal of Louisiana (1902–2006)

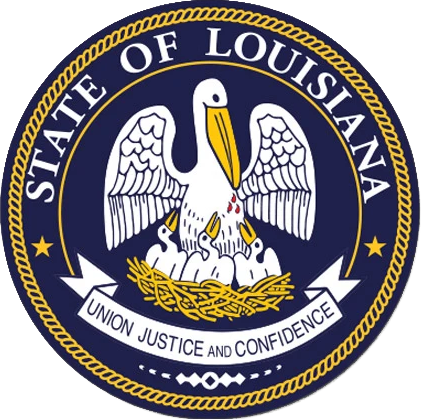
Seal of Louisiana (2006–2010)

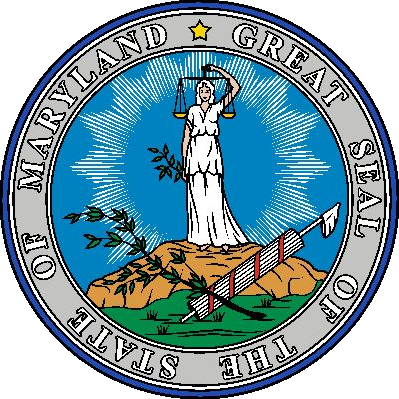
Great Seal of Maryland (1794–1817)

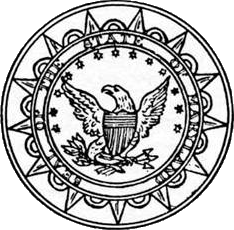
Seal of Maryland (1817–1854)

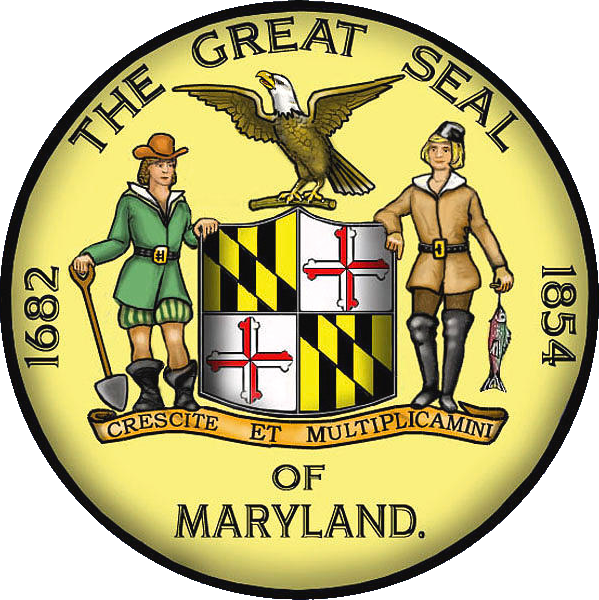
Great Seal of Maryland (1854–1874)

Seal of Minnesota (1861–1983)

Great Seal of Minnesota (1983–2024)

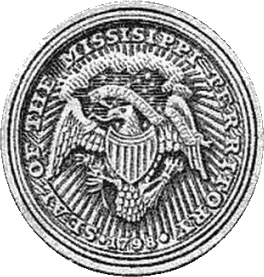
Seal of the Mississippi Territory (1798–1817)

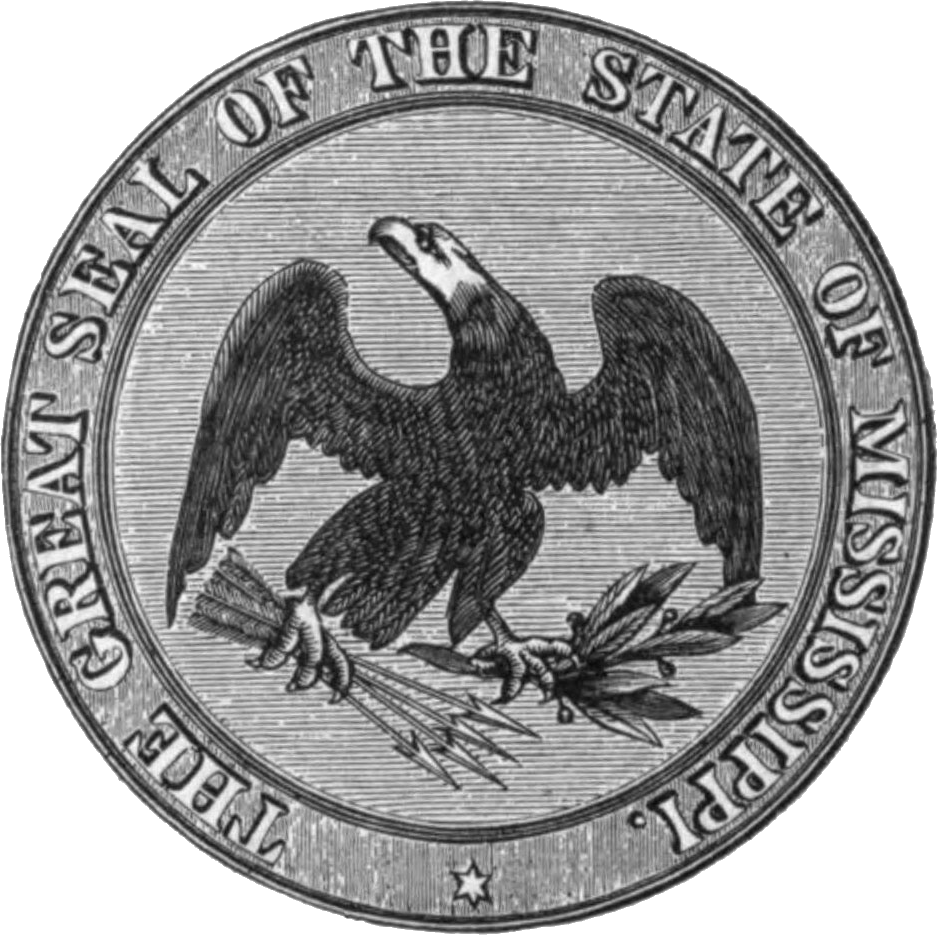
Great Seal of Mississippi (1818–1879)

Great Seal of Mississippi (1879–2014)

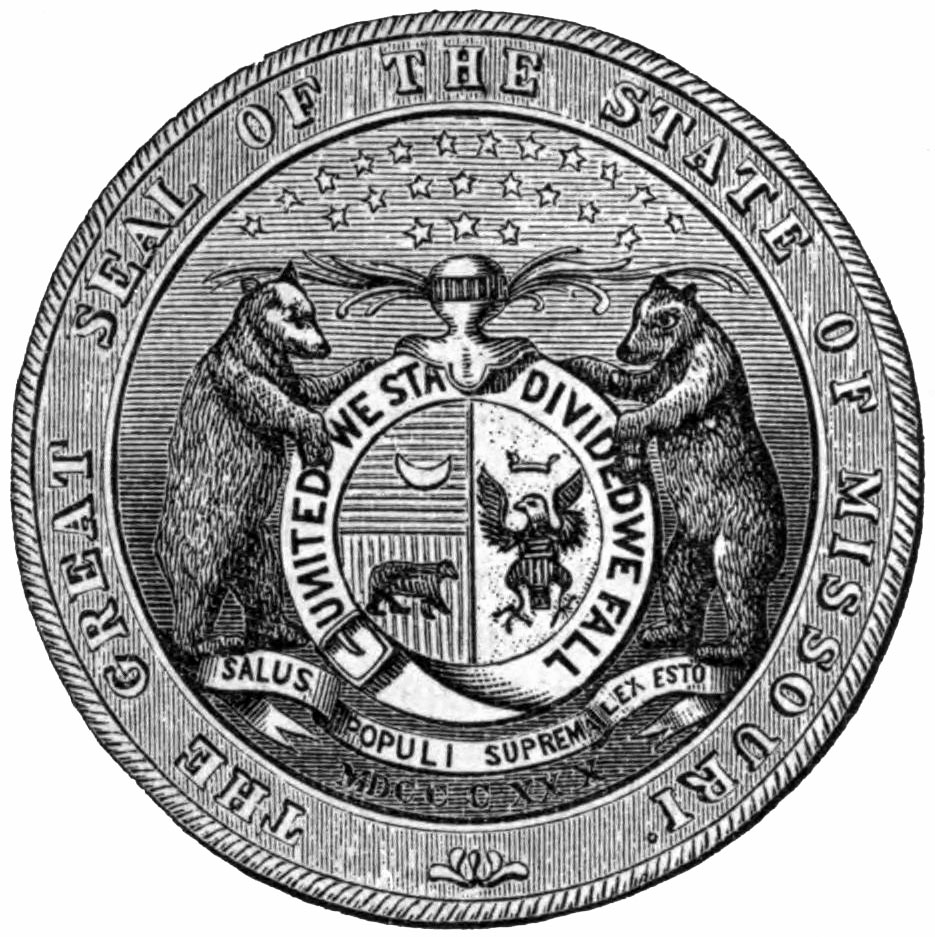
Great Seal of Missouri (1879–1907)

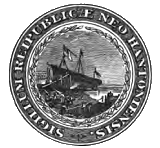
Seal of New Hampshire (1904–1931)

Seal of the Territory of New Mexico (1887–1912)

Great Seal of New York (1901 – 2020)

Great Seal of North Carolina (1971–1984)

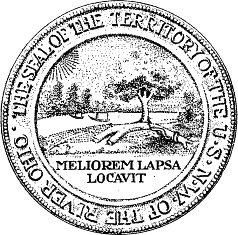
Seal of the Northwest Territory (1788–1802)

Great Seal of Ohio (1967–1996)

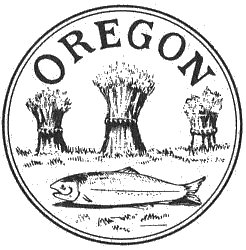
Seal of Provisional Government of Oregon (1843 – 1848)

Seal of Oregon Territory (1848 – 1859)

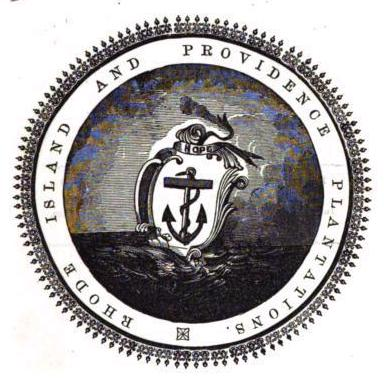
Seal of Rhode Island (1644 – 1853)

Seal of Rhode Island (1853 – 2020)

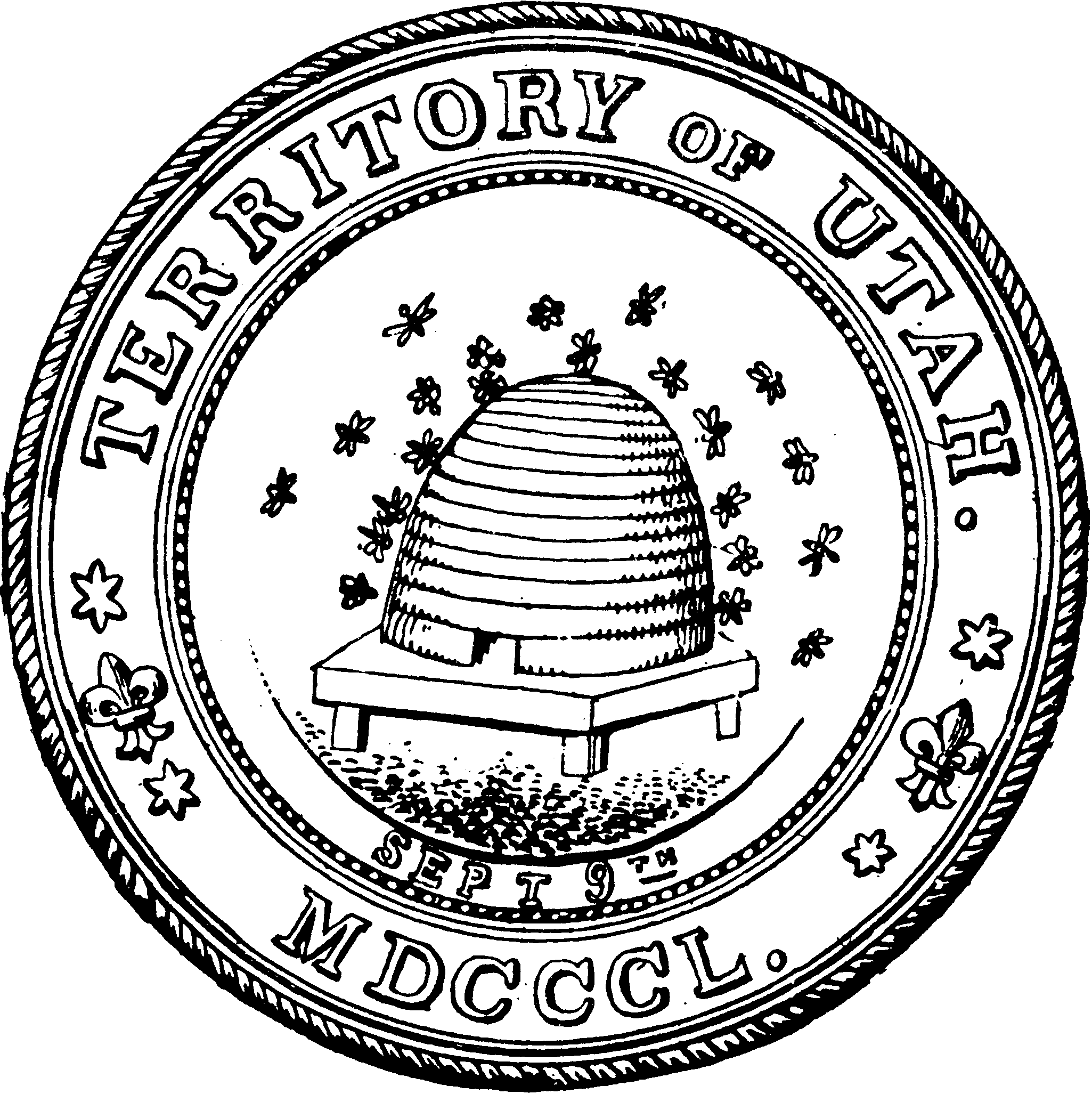
Seal of the Utah Territory (1850–1896)

Great Seal of Utah (1896—2011)

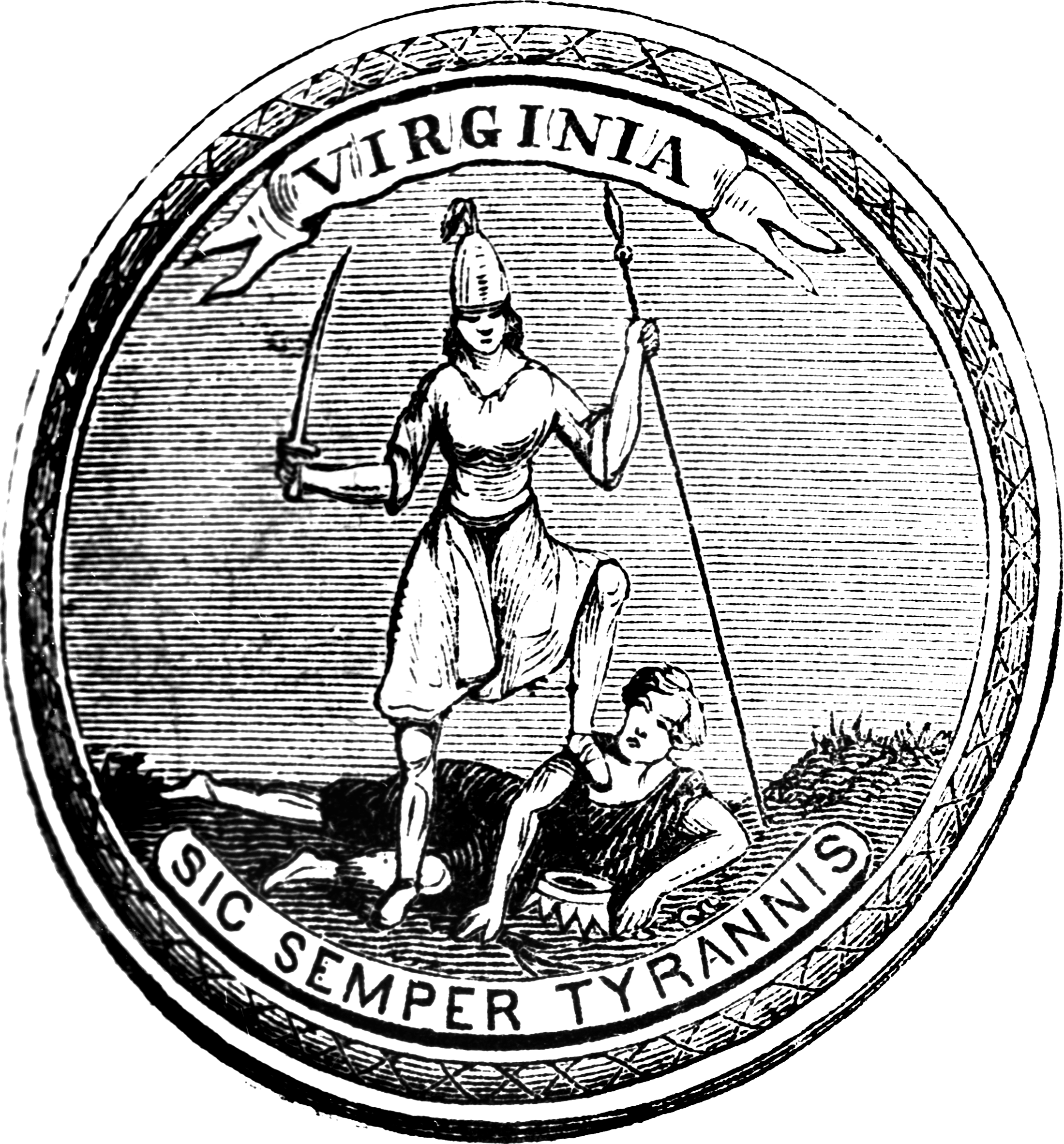
Seal of Virginia (1851–1875)

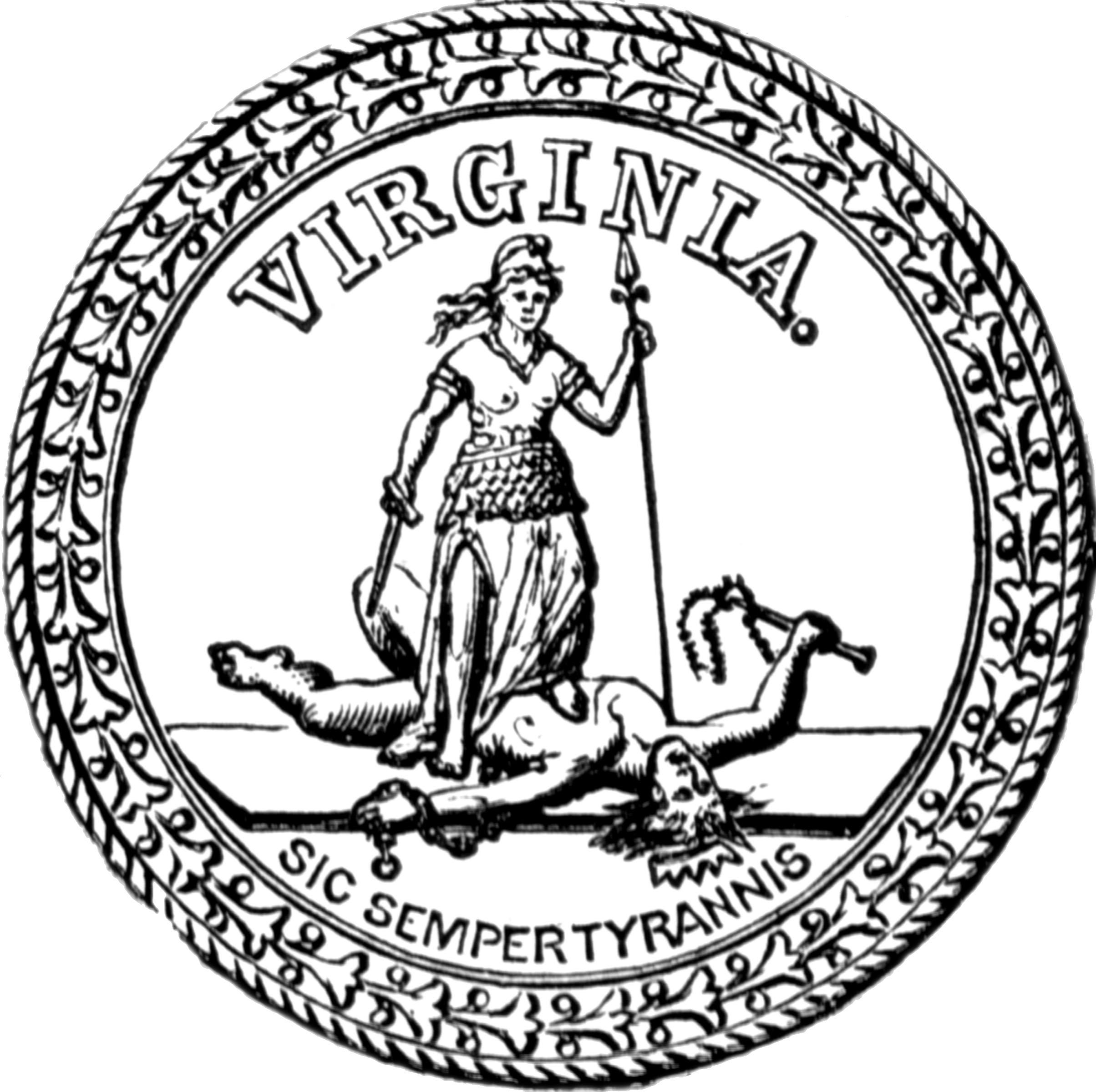
Seal of Virginia (1875)

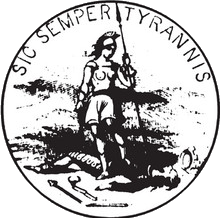
Seal of Virginia (1876–1904)

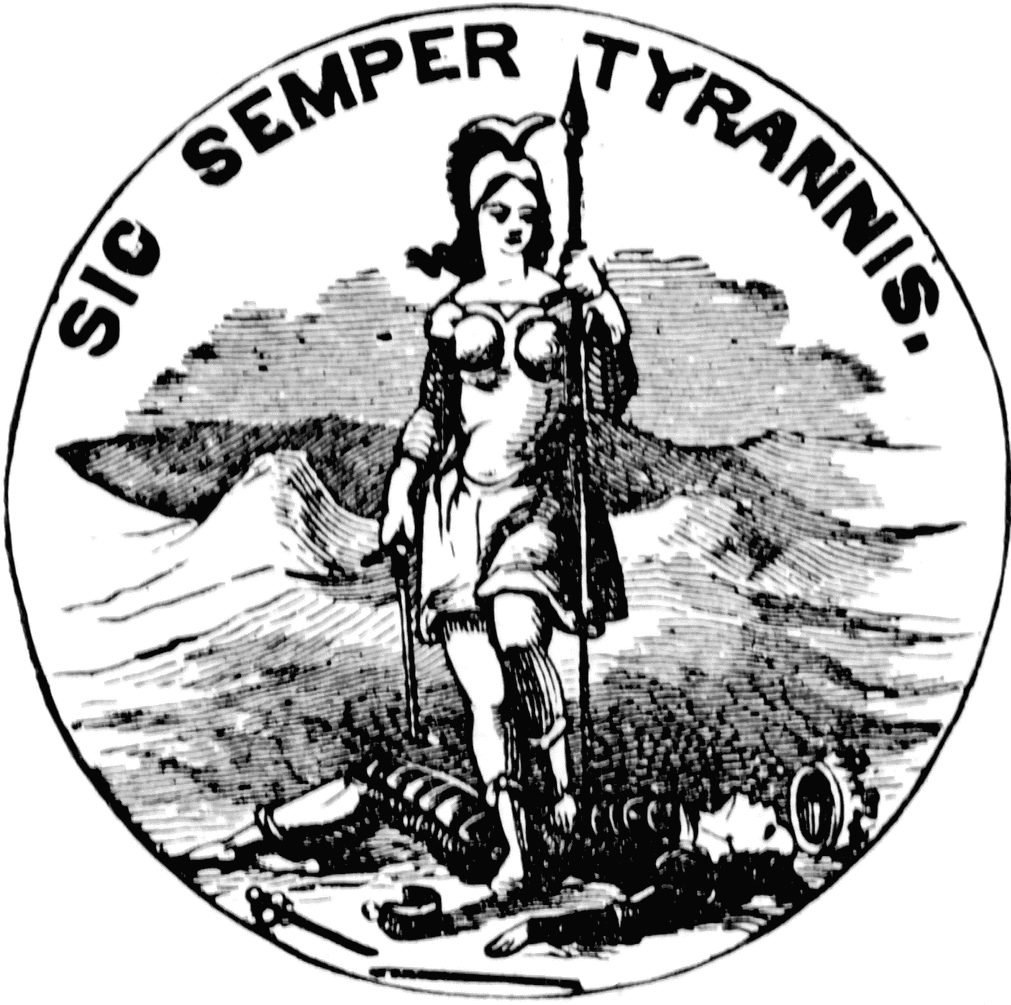
Seal of Virginia (1904–1950)

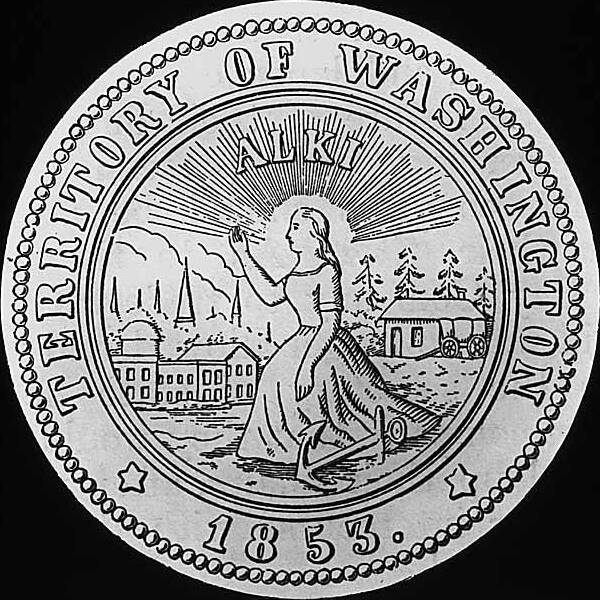
Seal of Washington Territory (1853–1899)

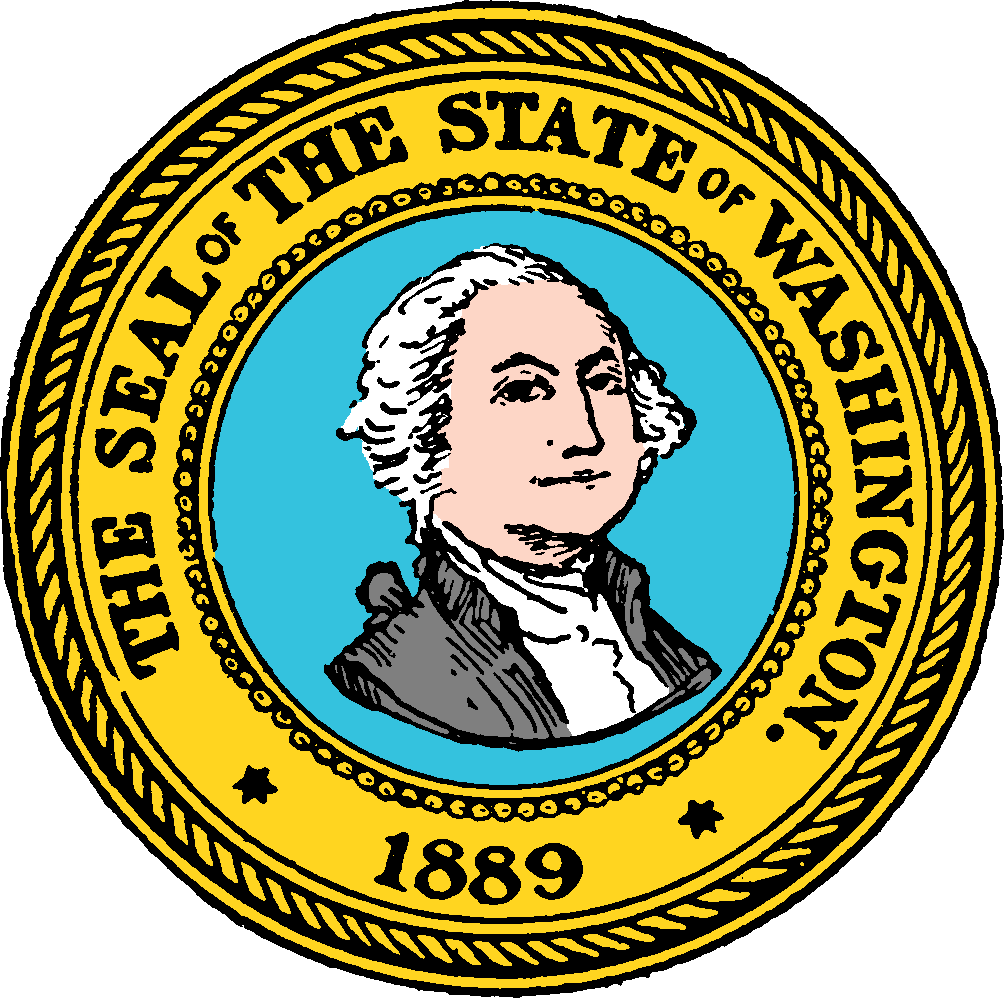
Seal of Washington (1899–1967)

Seal of the Insular Government of the Philippine Islands (1905–1935)

Seal of the Commonwealth of the Philippines
(1940-1941)

Seal of the Panama Canal Zone (1908–1979)

Seal of the Trust Territory of the Pacific Islands (1965–1980)

== See also ==
- Gallery of country coats of arms
- Lists of U.S. state topics
  - Flags of the U.S. states
  - Coats of arms of the U.S. states
