= Audemus jura nostra defendere =

State motto of Alabama; trans. "We dare defend our rights"

As it appears on the Alabama coat of arms

Audemus jura nostra defendere (pronounced [au̯ˈdeːmʊs ˈjuːra ˈnɔstra deːˈfɛndɛrɛ])—Latin for "We Dare Defend Our Rights" or "We Dare Maintain Our Rights"—is the state motto of Alabama and is depicted on the official Coat of arms of Alabama. It is also the current motto for the USS Alabama. The current coat of arms was created in 1923 at the request of state historian and director of the Alabama Department of Archives and History, Marie Bankhead Owen. It was not officially adopted until March 14, 1939. The motto itself is emblazoned on a golden band across the bottom of the coat of arms. The escutcheon of the coat of arms is quartered into the flags of the Kingdom of France, the Crown of Castile, the United Kingdom of Great Britain and Ireland, and the Confederate States of America, with a central overlay of the shield of the United States. Bald eagles serve as supporters to either side of the escutcheon. All is surmounted by a crimson and white torse and the Baldine, the sailing ship that Iberville and Bienville arrived in prior to the settlement of the colony of Mobile.

== History ==
The Seal of Alabama from 1868 until 1939. "Here We Rest" served as the official state motto during that time. The state's first seal of 1819, replaced by this one, was readopted as the official seal in 1939. It does not contain a motto.

The modern Alabama motto was added to the current coat of arms when it was created in 1923. It was officially adopted for use in 1939. It is the second state motto. The first motto was adopted by the Reconstruction Era state legislature on December 29, 1868, for use on the second Seal of Alabama. It depicted a bald eagle atop an American shield, holding a banner inscribed with the motto "Here We Rest" in its beak.

The source of the current motto is drawn from the lines of "An Ode in Imitation of Alcaeus", also known by its first line, "What constitutes a State?" It was published in 1781 by the 18th-century liberal English philologist Sir William Jones. This poem advanced his ideas on government and morality and was considered by scholars as his greatest political poem. In it he criticizes the widespread corruption of the day and misuse of monarchical power. The words were adjusted by Marie Bankhead Owen into a motto, which was then translated into Latin by Professor W. B. Saffold, of the University of Alabama.

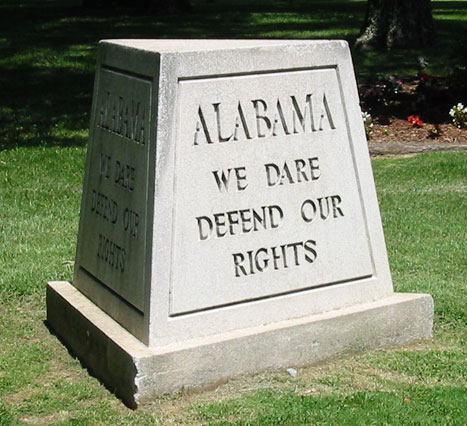
An inscribed marker bearing a translation of the motto near Huntsville, Alabama

What constitutes a State?

Not high-raised battlement or labored mound,

Thick wall or moated gate;

Not cities proud with spires and turrets crowned;

Not bays and broad-armed ports,

Where, laughing at the storm, rich navies ride;

Not starred and spangled courts,

Where low-browed baseness wafts perfume to pride.

No:—men, high-minded men,

With powers as far above dull brutes endued

In forest, brake, or den,

As beasts excel cold rocks and brambles rude;

Men, who their duties know,

But know their rights, and, knowing, dare maintain,

Prevent the long-aimed blow,

And crush the tyrant while they rend the chain:

These constitute a State,

And sovereign Law, that State’s collected will,

O’er thrones and globes elate,

Sits Empress, crowning good, repressing ill.

Smit by her sacred frown,

The fiend, Dissension, like a vapour sinks,

And e’en the all-dazzling crown

Hides her faint rays, and at her bidding shrinks.

Such was this heaven-loved isle,

Than Lesbos fairer and the Cretan shore!

No more shall Freedom smile?

Shall Britons languish, and be men no more?

Since all must life resign,

Those sweet rewards which decorate the brave,

’Tis folly to decline,

And steal inglorious to the silent grave.

— Sir William Jones, An Ode in Imitation of Alcaeus

== See also ==
- List of Alabama state symbols
