= USS Alabama (SSBN-731) =

Ohio-class submarine

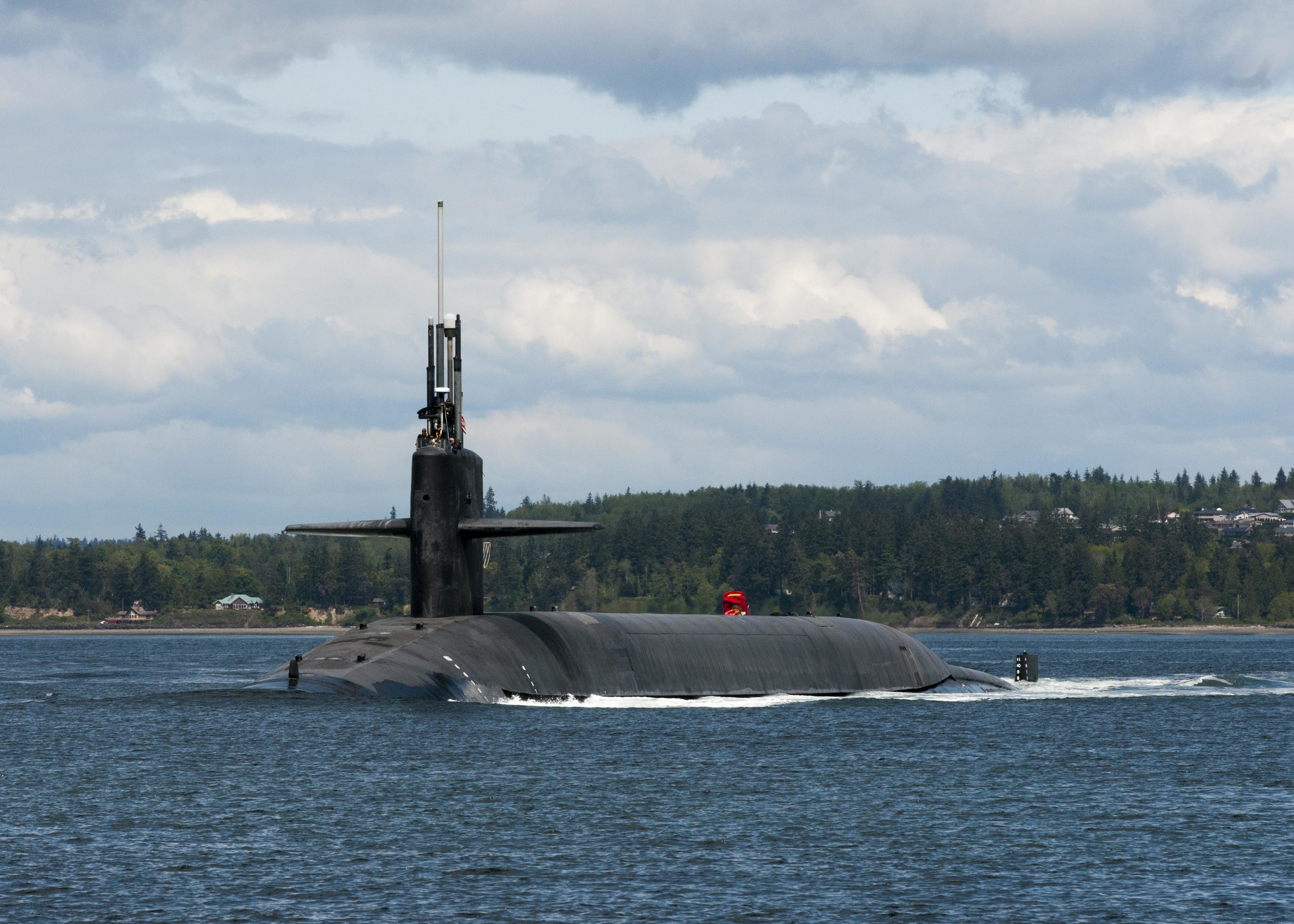
- USS Alabama (SSBN-731)

History

United States
- Name: Alabama
- Namesake: State of Alabama
- Ordered: 27 February 1978
- Builder: General Dynamics Electric Boat, Groton, Connecticut
- Laid down: 27 August 1981
- Launched: 19 May 1984
- Commissioned: 25 May 1985
- Home port: Naval Base Kitsap, Washington
- Motto: Audemus Jura Nostra Defendere; ("We dare defend our rights")
- Status: in active service
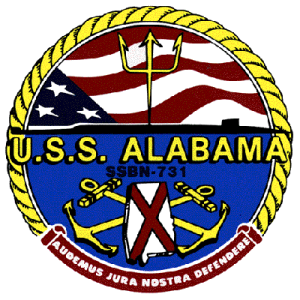
- Badge

General characteristics
- Class & type: Ohio-class ballistic missile submarine
- Displacement: 16,764 long tons (17,033 t) surfaced; 18,750 long tons (19,050 t) submerged
- Length: 560 ft (170 m)
- Beam: 42 ft (13 m)
- Draft: 38 ft (12 m)
- Propulsion: 1 × S8G PWR nuclear reactor (HEU 93.5%); 2 × geared turbines; 1 × 325 hp (242 kW) auxiliary motor; 1 × shaft @ 60,000 shp (45,000 kW)
- Speed: Greater than 25 knots (46 km/h; 29 mph)
- Test depth: Greater than 800 feet (240 m)
- Complement: 15 officers; 140 enlisted
- Armament: MK-48 torpedoes; 20 × Trident II D-5 ballistic missiles

USS Alabama (hull number SSBN-731) is the sixth Ohio-class nuclear-powered ballistic missile submarine, and the seventh United States vessel to be named for the state of Alabama. The boat's motto duplicates the state's motto, Audemus Jura Nostra Defendere ("We dare defend our rights").

== Construction and commissioning ==
The contract for Alabama's construction was awarded on 27 February 1978 and her keel was laid down on 27 August 1981 at Groton, Connecticut, by the Electric Boat Division of General Dynamics. She was launched on 19 May 1984, sponsored by Mrs. Barbara E. Dickinson, wife of William Louis Dickinson, Representative from Alabama, and commissioned at Naval Submarine Base New London at New London, Connecticut, on 25 May 1985.

== Operational history ==
After commissioning, Alabama departed Connecticut to conduct her shakedown cruise off the coast of Florida. After several domestic maneuvers and crew changes, Alabama visited Mobile, Alabama, before heading for the Panama Canal and from there to Bangor, Washington. Alabama operated out of Bangor until mid-May 1986, when she embarked on her first strategic deterrent patrol. Operating from the Pacific Northwest, Alabama carried out four deterrent patrols between June and December 1986.

In May 1988, Alabama conducted a successful test ballistic missile firing, launching two Trident I C4 ballistic missiles. On 1 September 1988, Alabama moored at Bangor to complete her ninth deterrent patrol and the 100th strategic deterrent patrol by a Trident-armed submarine. An official ceremony commemorating the event was held pier-side with then-Undersecretary of the Navy H. Lawrence Garrett III heading the official greeting party. Alabama conducted another test ballistic missile firing in August 1989, launching four Trident I C4 ballistic missiles.

In the 1990s Alabama conducted routine refit operations out of Bangor Washington, post-refit sea trials operations in Dabob Bay, and patrol operations in the Pacific Ocean. Ports-of-call included Seattle, Washington; San Diego, California, Long Beach, California; and Pearl Harbor, Hawaii.

In February 1991, Alabama was selected as the change of command platform for the Commander-in-Chief Pacific Fleet (CINCPACFLT) in Pearl Harbor. August 1992, Alabama embarked Commander-in-Chief, United States Strategic Command (CINCSTRATCOM) and his entourage of senior U.S. Air Force and Navy Officers for an at-sea submerged orientation tour concerning SSBN strategic deterrent operations. In January 1996, the boat was awarded the Battle Efficiency E and the Strategic Operations S by the Commander of Submarine Squadron 17. In March she was awarded the U.S. Strategic Command's Omaha Trophy for ballistic missile unit excellence. In March 1999, Alabama conducted exercises with the USS Constellation (CV-64) battle group and USS Topeka (SSN-754). In September she conducted underway operations for the Defense Advisory Counsel on Women in the Services.

After completing 47 strategic deterrent patrols, Alabama underwent a refit in 1999 and returned to service with numerous tactical and survivability upgrades. In spring 2000, Alabama completed her 50th strategic deterrent patrol and celebrated her 15th birthday. During February 2000 she conducted exercises with the USS Abraham Lincoln (CVN-72) battle group. In April she conducted a VIP cruise in Dabob Bay, Washington to host the Chief of Defense of Japan and members of his staff. In August she again conducted exercises with the USS Abraham Lincoln battle group.

Alabama entered the Bremerton Annex of Naval Base Kitsap in 2005 to undergo a nuclear reactor refueling overhaul and conversion of her ballistic missile systems to support the Trident II D5 ballistic missiles, which replaced her Trident I C4 ballistic missiles and launchers; Alabama was the last Trident C4-equipped submarine to be refitted with the Trident D5 missile system. The refueling overhaul and Trident D5 conversion was completed in February 2009.

As of January 2025, Alabama is part of Submarine Squadron 17 and her home port is at Naval Base Kitsap, Washington

Alabama is the recipient of the 2016 Trident Submarine Outstanding Performance Award, 2016 Retention Excellence Award, and 2017 Battle "E" award.

== In popular culture ==
- Alabama is the setting for the 1995 motion picture Crimson Tide, starring Denzel Washington and Gene Hackman. The boat herself is seen in the movie during the diving scene as she leaves port.
- Alabama is featured in the motion pictures Time Under Fire, On the Beach, and Danger Beneath the Sea, which reused footage from Crimson Tide.
- Alabama is featured in the 11th episode of the 2010 anime series Highschool of the Dead. The boat herself is seen under the water launching nuclear weapons at opposing countries.
