= Alabama State Bible =

Official bible of Alabama

The Alabama State Bible is a copy of the King James Version of the Bible dating from 1853, which is one of the symbols of the state of Alabama. It is the oldest state symbol of Alabama. It is kept on display at the Alabama Department of Archives and History in Montgomery, Alabama.

The State Bible was purchased in 1853 by the Executive Department of the state government, and has been used at the inauguration of every state governor since then. The Bible was also used when Jefferson Davis took the oath of office as President of the Confederate States of America in Alabama on February 18, 1861.

The flyleaf has been inscribed "Executive Office, Alabama, 1853". There is also a note inside the front cover of the Bible from Judge John Phelan (clerk of the Alabama Supreme Court, 1856–64) confirming that this was the Bible used by Davis, together with an affidavit sworn in 1884 by Ellis Phelan (the judge's son and Secretary of State of Alabama) verifying his father's handwriting and attendance at Davis's inauguration.
