= Seal of the Navajo Nation =

Official symbol of the Native American nation

Navajo Nation

The Seal of the Navajo Nation or the Great Seal of Navajo Nation, in the United States, is an official symbol of the Navajo Nation, alongside the flag. It was designed by a native of Many Farms, Arizona, John Claw Jr. It was adopted on January 18, 1852, by resolution CJ-9-52

In May 1988, the Navajo Nation Council changed the original work from the Great Seal of the Navajo Tribe to the Great Seal of the Navajo Nation. The number of arrowheads was increased to 50 from 48 to represent the added states of Hawaii and Alaska.

== Symbolism ==
The outline of the seal consists of 50 black projectiles, which symbolize the protection by 50 states. The three concentric lines inside of red, yellow and blue colour respectively represent the rainbow and the sovereignty of the Navajo Nation, with the opening on top of those lines being considered the east. Rainbow doesn't close at the top, which represents tribe's sovereign immunity. The yellow sun beneath the concentric circles shines on four sacred mountains of the Navajo Nation in their ceremonial colours. White on a top stands for White-Shell Woman (Blanca Peak), blue one in the east represents Turquoise Woman (Mount Taylor), yellow to the south symbolizes Abalone Woman (San Francisco Peaks) and the black in the west stands for the Jet Black Woman (Hesperus Mountain). Two corn plants, green in color, are located in the bottom and represent the sustainability of life of the Navajo. The tips of the two corn plants are decorated with pollen, which is often used in ceremonies. In the center, between the mountains, sheep, horse and cow are located, all of which symbolize the Navajo livestock industry.
