= Alabama state creed =

The Alabama state creed, adopted in 1953, is a statement of belief or creed for to the State of Alabama. It was approved via Act no. 244 in the Alabama Legislature, after a recommendation by the Board and Council of the Alabama Federation of Women’s Clubs.

The creed was written by Mrs. H.P. Thetford from Birmingham, Alabama.

== Text of the creed ==
I believe in Alabama, a state dedicated to a faith in God and the enlightenment of mankind; to a democracy that safeguards the liberties of each citizen and to the conservation of her youth, her ideals, and her soil. I believe it is my duty to obey her laws, to respect her flag and to be alert to her needs and generous in my efforts to foster her advancement within the statehood of the world.
