= Coat of arms of Alabama =

Coat of arms of the State of Alabama

Coat of arms of the State of Alabama

Versions
- The coat of arms is often used in the form of a seal

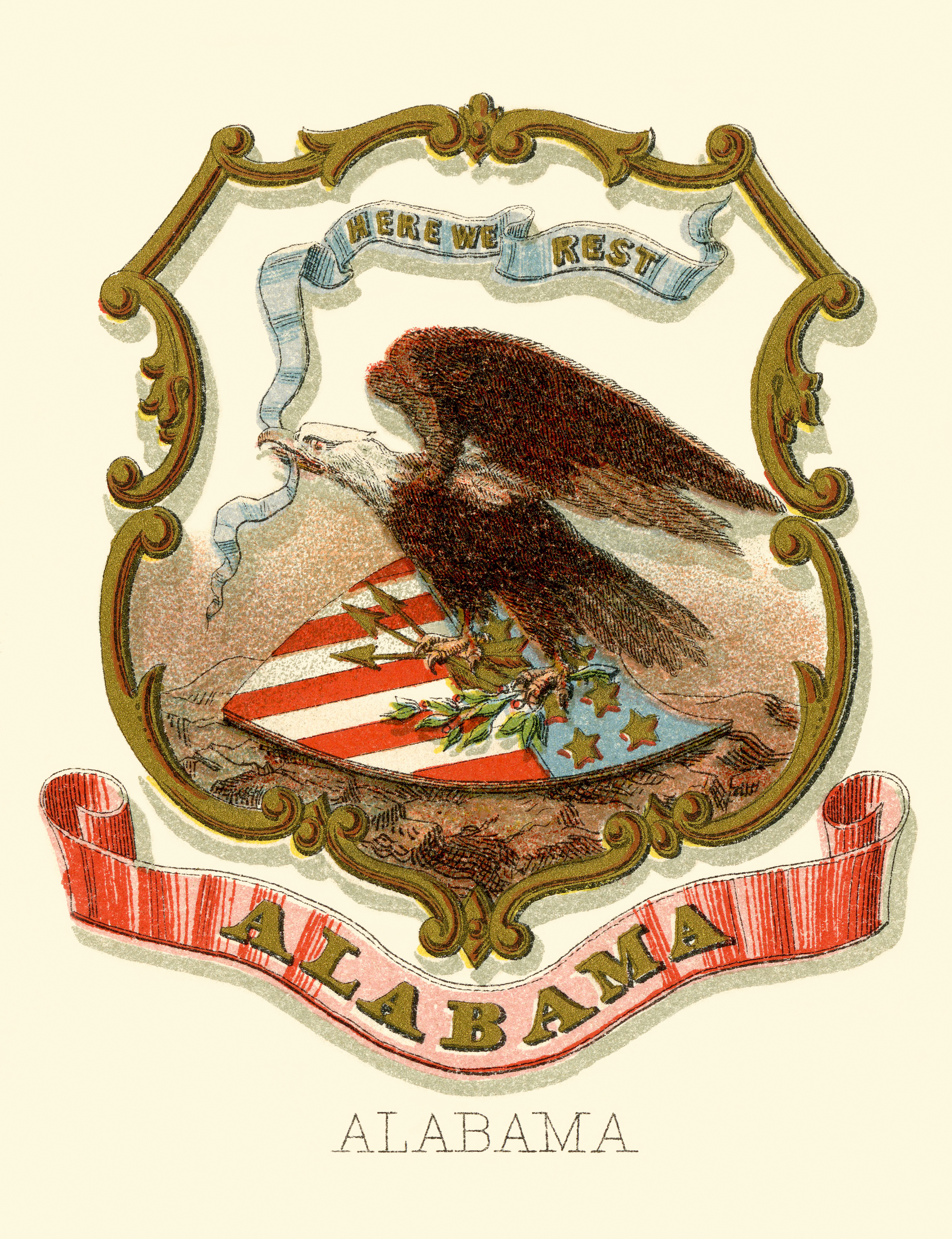
- Historical coat of arms (illustrated, 1876)
- Armiger: State of Alabama
- Adopted: March 14, 1939
- Crest: A full rigged ship proper
- Shield: Quarterly, the first azure three fleur de lis or (for France); second quarterly first and fourth gules a tower triple towered or, second and third argent a lion rampant gules (for Spain); third azure a saltire argent and gules over all a cross of the last fimbriated of the second (for Great Britain); fourth gules of a saltire azure, fimbriated argent 13 mullets of the last (for the Confederacy); at center in escutcheon chief azure paly argent and gules 13 (for United States)
- Supporters: Two North American eagles displayed
- Motto: Audemus jura nostra defendere (Latin: "We dare defend our rights")

The coat of arms of Alabama depicts a shield upon which is carried the symbols of the five states which have at various times held sovereignty over a part or the whole of what is now Alabama. These are the ancient coat of arms of France (three fleurs-de-lis), the ancient coat of arms of Crown of Castile for Spain (Castile quartering León), the modern Union Jack of the United Kingdom (anachronistically, since a different version of the British flag would have been flown in British West Florida and the Province of Georgia long before the Alabama Territory was established) and the battle flag of the Confederate States. On an escutcheon of pretence is borne the shield of the United States. The crest of the coat represents a ship (the "Badine") which brought the French colonists who established the first permanent European settlements in the territory. Below is the state motto: Audemus jura nostra defendere, meaning "We dare defend our rights."

The bill to adopt a state coat of arms was introduced in the Alabama Legislature of 1939 by James Simpson, Jefferson County, and was passed without a dissenting vote by both houses.

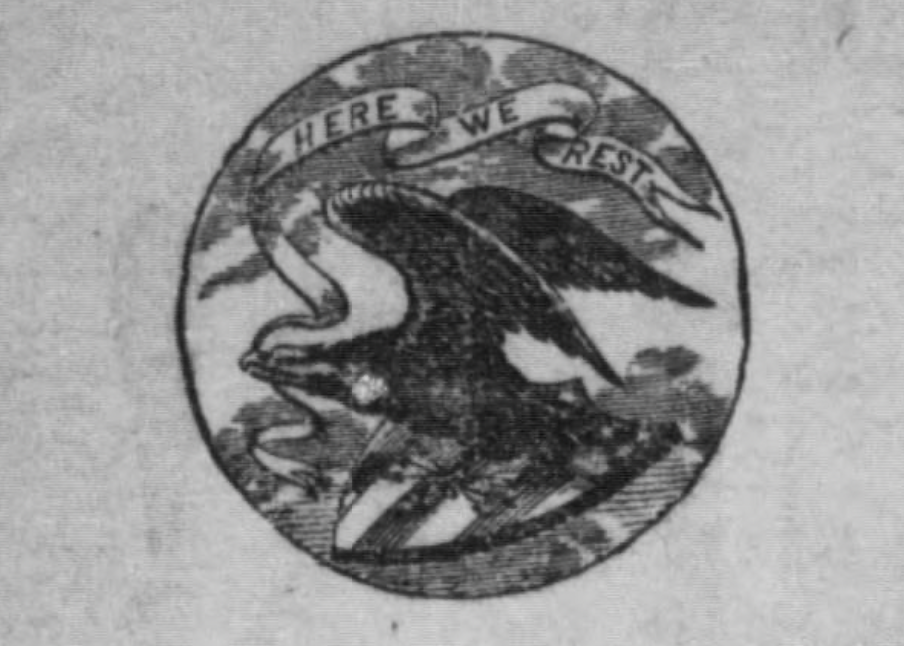
Coat of arms from 1899

The original design of the Alabamian coat of arms was made in 1923 by B.J. Tieman, New York, an authority on heraldry, at the request of Marie Bankhead Owen, Director of the Department of Archives and History. A few years later Naomi Rabb Winston, Washington, DC, painted the completed design in oil. Mrs. Owen selected the motto which was put into Latin by Professor W.B. Saffold, of the University of Alabama. It was through the influence of Juliet Perry Dixon, wife of Governor Frank Dixon, that official action was taken by the Legislature.

British flag that would have been flown in what is now Alabama (part of British West Florida and the Province of Georgia) prior to U.S. independence.

The Union Flag depicted on the coat of arms, which is meant to represent the period of British rule in Alabama prior to the 1783 Treaty of Paris, is not actually the flag used at that time. It dates to the 1801 formation of the United Kingdom of Great Britain and Ireland, whereas the preceding Kingdom of Great Britain held sovereignty over Alabama prior to 1783.

== Official description ==
The official description, in heraldic language, is laid out in the Code of Alabama, Section 1-2-2:

Arms: quarterly, the first azure three fleur de lis or (for France); second quarterly first and fourth gules a tower tripple [sic] towered or, second and third argent a lion rampant gules (for Spain); third azure a saltire argent and gules over all a cross of the last fimbriated of the second (for Great Britain); fourth gules of a saltire azure, fimbriated argent 13 mullets of the last (for the Confederacy); at center in escutcheon chief azure paly argent and gules 13 (for United States) arms supported by two American eagles displayed. Crest: A full rigged ship proper.

== Use ==
Besides being used by itself, the coat of arms is used on many governmental seals of the state, as well as the flag of the governor of Alabama.

Flag of the governor of Alabama

Seal of the governor of Alabama

Seal of the lieutenant governor of Alabama

Seal of the governor-elect of Alabama

Seal of the Alabama Board of Pardons and Paroles

Seal of the Alabama Department of Public Health

Seal of the Alabama Department of Public Safety

Seal of the Securities Commission of Alabama

Alabama Sesquicentennial Flag, designed in 1969 to mark Alabama's 150th anniversary of statehood

== Controversy ==
The presence of the Confederate battle flag on the coat of arms has generated debate. Some view it as a symbol of racism and oppression, while others see it as a meaningful part of Alabama's history. Regardless, the historical accuracy of using a battle flag as opposed to the standard Confederate flag, along with the presence of the Union Jack, which Steve Murray, the director of the Alabama Department of Archives and History, claims never flew over the state, is also disputable.

== See also ==
- Great Seal of Alabama
- Coats of arms of the U.S. states
- Confederate battle flag on state seals
