= Coat of arms of Rhode Island =

Official emblem of Rhode Island

Coat of arms of the State of Rhode Island

Versions
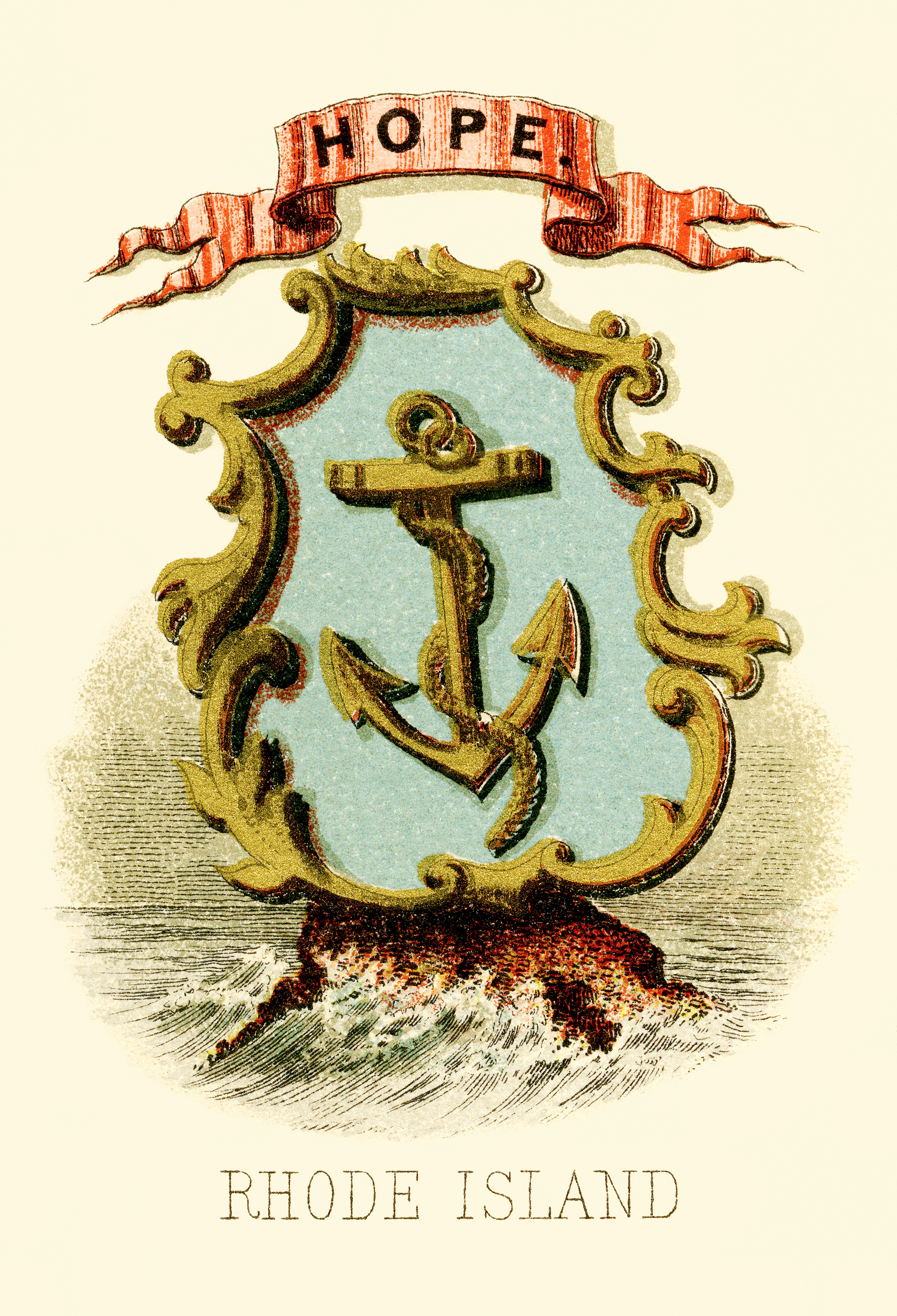
- Historical coat of arms (1876)
- Armiger: State of Rhode Island
- Adopted: 1 February 1882.
- Crest: None
- Torse: None
- Shield: Azure, an Anchor Or
- Supporters: None
- Compartment: None
- Motto: Hope
- Order: None
- Other elements: None

The coat of arms of Rhode Island is an official emblem of the state, alongside the seal and state flag. The blazon (description) was officially adopted by the General Assembly in 1881, to be effective 1 February 1882.

The arms are described legally thus: "The arms of the state are a golden anchor on a blue field, and the motto thereof is the word 'Hope'".

== Use ==
Besides being used by itself, the coat of arms of Rhode Island is used on the standard (flag) of the governor of Rhode Island, and many governmental seals of the state.

Flag of the governor of Rhode Island

Seal of the governor

Seal of the lieutenant governor

== See also ==
- Coats of arms of the U.S. states
