= Seal of Alabama =

Official government emblem of the U.S. state of Alabama

The Great Seal of the State of Alabama
- Seal in use since 1939

Versions
- Seal of 1817–1868

- Seal of 1868–1939

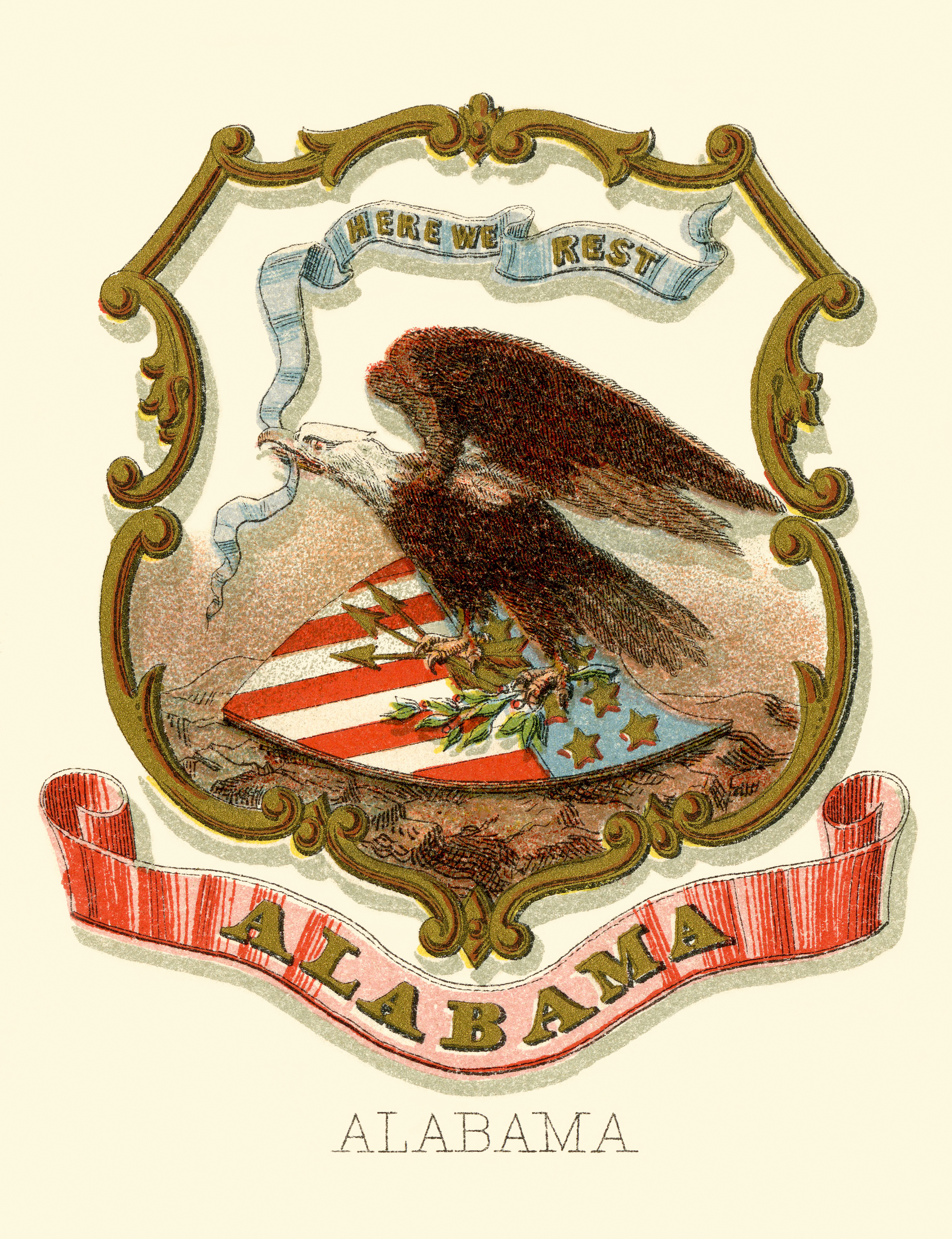
- Historical coat of arms (illustrated, 1876)
- Armiger: State of Alabama
- Adopted: 1939

The great seal of the state of Alabama is the state seal of the U.S. state of Alabama.

== Seal of 1817 ==
The first seal was designed in 1817 by William Wyatt Bibb, the governor of the Alabama Territory and the subsequent first governor of the state. When Alabama became a state in 1819, the state legislature adopted the design as the official state seal. The seal prominently features a map showing one of the state's most valuable resources—its major rivers. The map was shown affixed to a living tree, with no motto.

== Seal of 1868 ==
The design was replaced with a new seal on December 29, 1868, featuring an American bald eagle with a U.S. shield. The law describes the design thus:

The seal is in the form of a circle, and two and a quarter inches in diameter; near the edge is the word 'ALABAMA' and opposite, at the same distance from the edge, are the words 'GREAT SEAL.' In the centre of the seal an eagle is represented with raised wings alighting upon the national shield, with three arrows in his left talon. The eagle holds in his beak a streamer, on which immediately over the wings are the words 'HERE WE REST.' The crest-word, which give name to the State, signifies "The land of rest."

This design is still used by the Alabama Department of Labor.

== Seal of 1939 ==
In 1939, at the request of Governor Frank M. Dixon, the original concept of a map design was returned to use. The new seal was adopted during a special session called by the Governor. The design was described as follows:

The seal shall be circular, and the diameter there of two and a quarter inches; near the edge of the circle shall be the word "Alabama," and opposite this word, at the same distance from the edge, shall be the words, "Great Seal." In the center of the seal there shall be a representation of a map of the state with its principal rivers. The seal shall be called the "Great Seal of the State of Alabama." The seal shall be kept and used as required by the Constitution and laws.

The use of stars in the border, the specific design of the letterforms and the map image, the labeling of adjacent states and the Gulf of Mexico, and the application of colors to the seal are not described in the law.

== Seals of the government of Alabama ==
There are several seals of the government of Alabama, which use a variety of designs, including the coat of arms of Alabama, the state seal, and other distinct elements.

Seal of the governor of Alabama

Seal of the lieutenant governor of Alabama

Seal of the governor-elect of Alabama

Seal of the speaker of the Alabama House of Representatives

Seal of the Unified Judicial System of Alabama

Seal of the attorney general of Alabama

Seal of the Alabama Board of Pardons and Paroles

Seal of the Alabama Emergency Management Agency

Seal of the Alabama Department of Agriculture and Industries

Seal of the Alabama Department of Corrections

Seal of the Alabama Department of Homeland Security

Seal of the Alabama Department of Labor

Seal of the Alabama Department of Public Health

Seal of the Alabama Department of Public Safety

Seal of the Alabama Department of Transportation

Seal of the Alabama Treasury Department

Seal of the Securities Commission of Alabama

Seal of the Alabama National Guard

Coat of arms of the Alabama State Defense Force

== See also ==
- Coat of arms of Alabama
- Flag of Alabama
