= Alabama Department of Public Health =

Government agency in Alabama, United States

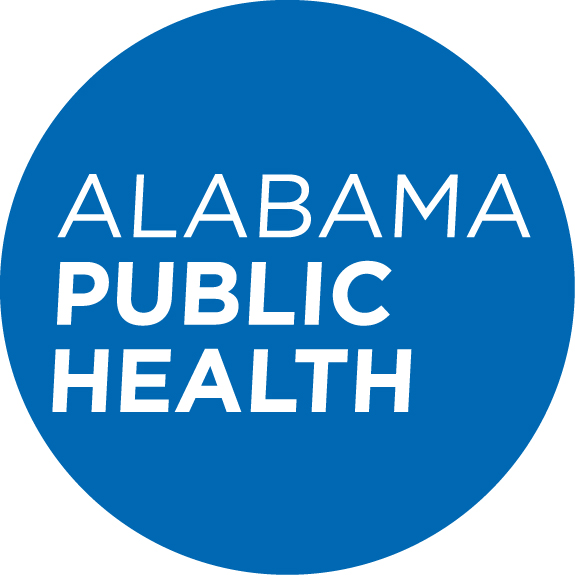
- Logo for the Alabama Department of Public Health

Agency overview
- Formed: 1875
- Jurisdiction: State of Alabama
- Headquarters: RSA Tower 201 Monroe Street Montgomery, Alabama
- Agency executive: Scott Harris, MD, MPH, State Health Officer
- Website: alabamapublichealth.gov

The Alabama Department of Public Health is the primary state health agency of the government of the U.S. state of Alabama. It provides a number of public health services to Alabama residents. Chronically underfunded for decades, even by a health professional as governor (Bentley), it ranks near the bottom among states.

== History ==
In 1907, the state established a public health laboratory to ensure the quality of drinking water and milk. In 1910 it created a Hookworm Commission. The commission was mostly funded by the Rockefeller Fund. In 1918, Alabama ranked eleven amongst the twelve Southern states in funding of public health. In 2021, USNews ranks Alabama's public health 45th out of 50 states and DC.

Around 2010, the Bureau of Clinical Laboratories moved to Prattville.

== Organization ==
=== State Board of Health ===
"The Alabama State Board of Health was constituted by Code of Ala. 1975, §2221, and is charged with the responsibility for safeguarding the public health through enforcement of the public health laws of the State of Alabama..." "The Medical Association of the State of Alabama is the State Board of Health. The State Board of Health and its administrative arm, the Department of Public Health, have central offices located in the state’s capital city, Montgomery, Alabama." "The terms State Board of Health, State Committee of Public Health, State Department of Public Health, and State Health Officer are used interchangeably except where the context prohibits."

=== State Committee of Public Health ===
"The Board functions through the State Committee of Public Health as constituted by Code of Ala. 1975, §2224, which is composed of 12 members of the Medical Association of the State of Alabama and the chairman of each of four councils provided for by statute. The 16 members function under the leadership of a chairman and a vice chairman elected by the membership for a term of four years."

"The State Committee of Public Health meets monthly. Agendas are available to any interested persons not less than seven days in advance of the meeting, if available, in accordance with the Alabama Open Meetings Act. All meetings will be open to the public unless closed in accordance with the Alabama Open Meetings Act." "Minutes of the Committee meetings are prepared and are available at the Board of Health offices for inspection during regular business hours."

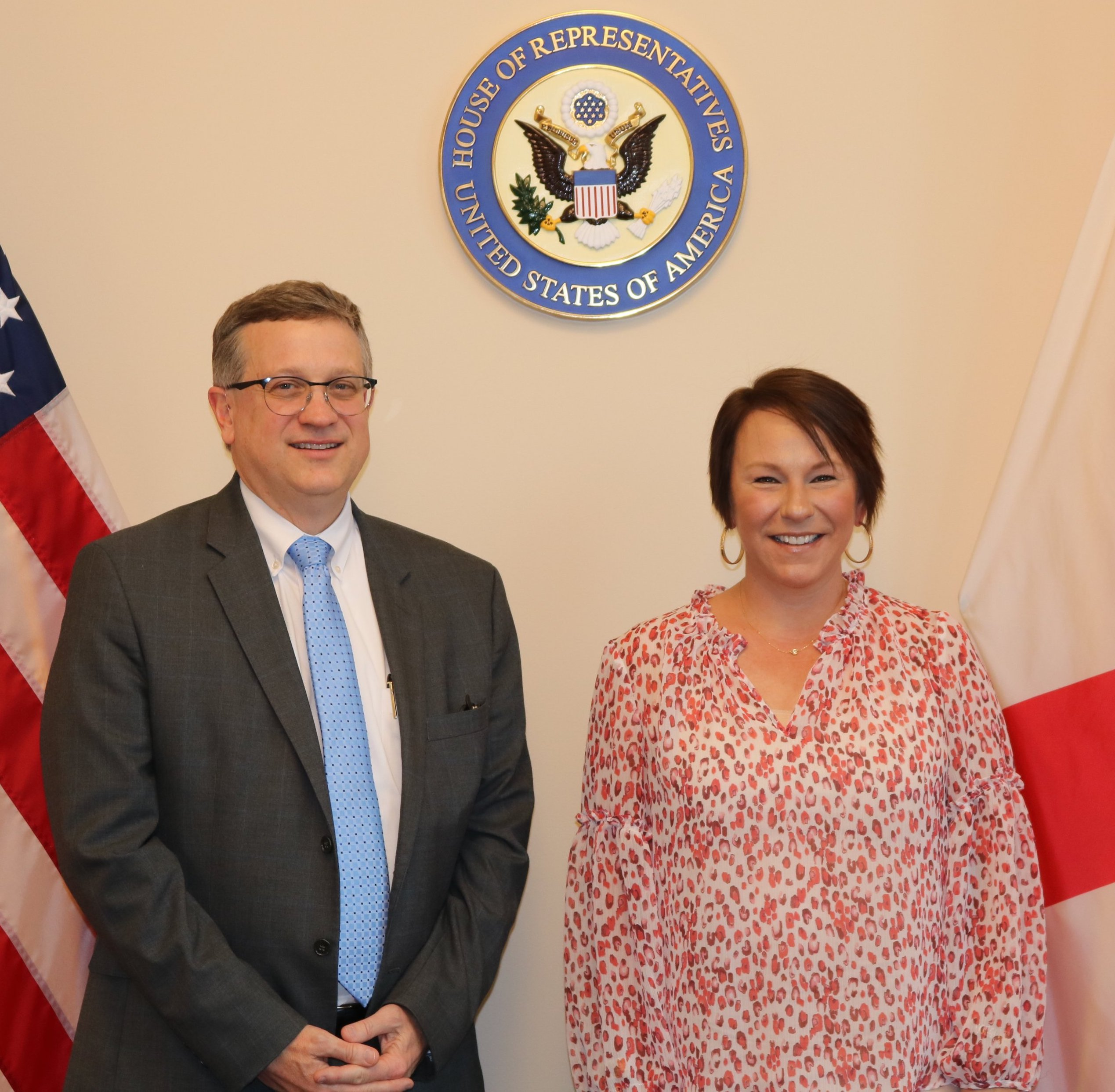
State Health Officer Dr. Scott Harris with Congressmember Martha Roby in 2020.

=== State Health Officer ===
"The Committee of Public Health elects an executive officer who is known as the State Health Officer and who is responsible for the day-to-day administration of the Board's activities." The Department of Public Health has a Public Health Administrative Officer and Assistant State Health Officers for Disease Control and Prevention, Emergency Response, and Personal and Community Health, who answer directly to the State Health Officer. The current State Health Officer is Dr. Scott Harris, MD, MPH.

=== Central Office ===
The Department of Public Health's Central Office, located in the state's capital city, Montgomery, Alabama is organized into offices, bureaus, divisions, and units. There are 2000-3000 Alabama Department of Public Health employees, including central office staff, public health area officers and administrators, and county health department staff.

=== Public Health Districts ===
The department divides the state of Alabama into eight Public Health Districts. Each Public Health Area Office is overseen by a District Health Officer or District Administrator. District Offices are responsible for developing public health services and programs specific to the needs of each district.

- Northern Public Health District includes the following Alabama counties: Colbert County, Alabama, Cullman County, Alabama, Franklin County, Alabama, Jackson County, Alabama, Lauderdale County, Alabama, Lawrence County, Alabama, Limestone County, Alabama, Madison County, Alabama, Marion County, Alabama, Marshall County, Alabama, Morgan County, Alabama and Winston County, Alabama.
- Northeastern Public Health District includes the following Alabama counties: Blount County, Alabama, Calhoun County, Alabama, Cherokee County, Alabama, Clay County, Alabama, Cleburne County, Alabama, DeKalb County, Alabama, Etowah County, Alabama, St. Clair County, Alabama, Shelby County, Alabama, Randolph County, Alabama, and Talladega County, Alabama.
- Jefferson Public Health District includes Jefferson County, Alabama.
- West Central Public Health District includes the following Alabama counties: Bibb County, Alabama, Chilton County, Alabama, Fayette County, Alabama, Greene County, Alabama, Hale County, Alabama, Lamar County, Alabama, Perry County, Alabama, Pickens County, Alabama, Sumter County, Alabama, Tuscaloosa County, Alabama, and Walker County, Alabama.
- East Central Public Health District includes the following Alabama counties: Autauga County, Alabama, Bullock County, Alabama, Chambers County, Alabama, Coosa County, Alabama, Elmore County, Alabama, Lowndes County, Alabama, Lee County, Alabama, Macon County, Alabama, Montgomery County, Alabama, Russell County, Alabama, and Tallapoosa County, Alabama.
- Southwestern Public Health District includes the following Alabama counties: Baldwin County, Alabama, Choctaw County, Alabama, Clarke County, Alabama, Conecuh County, Alabama, Dallas County, Alabama, Escambia County, Alabama, Marengo County, Alabama, Monroe County, Alabama, Washington County, Alabama and Wilcox County, Alabama.
- Southeastern Public Health District includes the following Alabama counties: Barbour County, Alabama, Butler County, Alabama, Coffee County, Alabama, Covington County, Alabama, Crenshaw County, Alabama, Dale County, Alabama, Geneva County, Alabama, Henry County, Alabama, Houston County, Alabama, Pike County, Alabama.
- Mobile Public Health District includes Mobile County, Alabama.

=== County Health Departments ===
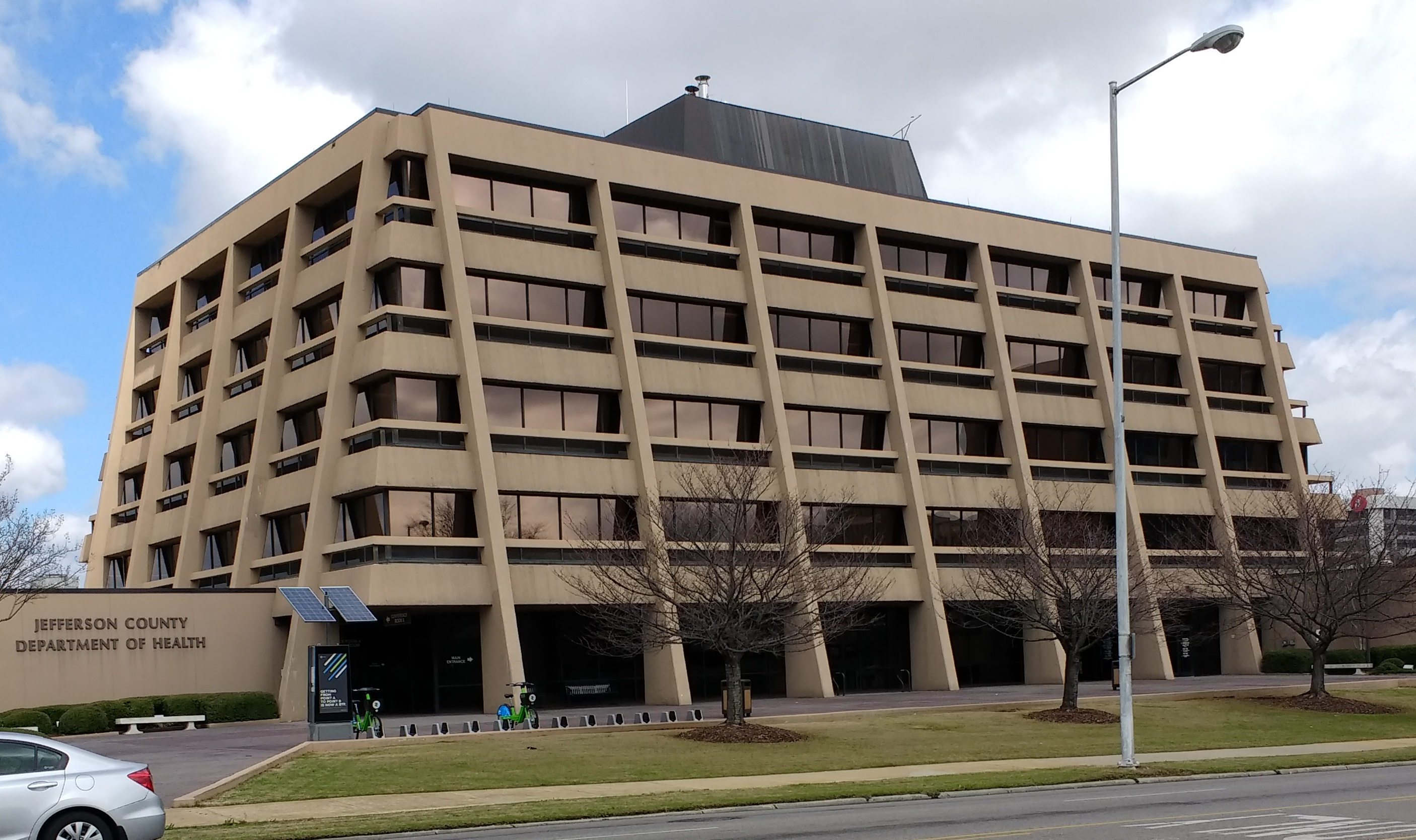
Jefferson County Department of Health

The department provides technical support and guidance to county health departments in all Alabama counties, as well as guidance and consultation to the two independent city-county health departments in Jefferson County, Alabama and Mobile County, Alabama. The State Board of Health provides supervision to the Jefferson and Mobile county health departments which are governed by their local county board of health.

==== Services and Programs ====
County health departments offer clinical, environmental, and home and community services to local residents. Certified birth, death, marriage, and divorce records/certificates for a vital event which occurred within the U.S. state of Alabama may be obtained from a local county health department for a fee. Services vary from health department to health department.

===== Clinical Services =====
Clinical services may include but are not limited to: cancer screening, family planning, health insurance for children, immunization, WIC, sexually transmitted diseases (STDs) and HIV/AIDS testing and counseling, and tuberculosis screening.

Cancer screening services include but are not limited to: Pap smears, breast examinations, self-examination instructions, and assistance in finding treatment for cancer if needed. Uninsured or underinsured women ages 40 to 64 with income eligibility at or below 200% of the federal poverty guidelines qualify for free services, including a pelvic examination, Pap smears, clinical breast examination, mammogram, and diagnostic services such as an ultrasound, colposcopy, or biopsy if needed, through the Alabama Breast and Cervical Cancer Early Detection Program (ABCCEDP).

Family planning services include but are not limited to: family planning methods, counseling, and education, birth control information, medical examinations, and distribution of supplies. Contraceptives are available to those in the childbearing age group.

Local county health departments provide information on All Kids, a low-cost health care coverage program for all eligible children under the age of 19. All Kids is the result of a partnership between The Alabama Department of Public Health, The Alabama Medicaid Agency, and the Alabama Child Caring Foundation. Alabama was the first state in the nation to have a federally approved State Children's Health Insurance Program (CHIP) plan. CHIP was added to the Social Security Act by the Balanced Budget Act of 1997. The purpose of this program is to provide health insurance to the country's uninsured children under the age of 19.

Immunization to prevent polio, diphtheria, tetanus (lockjaw), pertussis (whooping cough), measles, mumps, rubella (German measles), Hib (Haemophilus influenzae type B), and Hepatitis B are provided by the county health departments. A certificate of immunizations, known as the “blue slip,” is required for entry into all day care centers, Head Start, and public and private schools through grade 12. Vaccinations for adults for measles, pneumonia, tetanus, flu, and other diseases, including those required for overseas travel are also available.

Health assessments, supplemental food, and nutrition education are available to pregnant, breastfeeding, and postpartum women, infants, and children up to five years of age who qualify for WIC, the supplemental food program for women, infants, and children.

Confidential testing, treatment, and counseling for most sexually transmitted diseases (STDs) and HIV/AIDS are available for anyone 12 years of age or older. Social work services, home care services, and referrals to other support services in the community are available to clients with HIV or AIDS.

Tuberculosis (TB) screening—Tuberculin skin test, sputum culture/test, and X-ray (if indicated)—are available to anyone for tuberculosis diagnosis and tuberculosis treatment. Medication, if indicated and assistance in finding additional care are also provided.

Health education is a primary component of every program. Some clinical health services require an appointment, while others are offered on a walk-in basis. Some clinical services may require a fee.

===== Home and Community Services =====
Home and community services include home health care and life care services, and elderly and disabled and HIV/AIDS Medicaid waiver case management. Home health care services can include skilled nursing care, intravenous therapy, diabetic care, cardiovascular care, post hospital assessment and teaching, and urinary catheter management; home care health aide; medical social work; physical therapy to include postsurgical therapy; and occupational therapy and speech therapy. Life care services can include personal care aide, companionship, skilled and unskilled homemaker and respite care, and telehealth biomonitoring. Case managers for the Elderly and Disabled and HIV/AIDS Medicaid waiver programs aim to develop individualized care plans, based on the client's ongoing care needs, to help maintain independence in a safe home environment.

===== Environmental Services =====
The Alabama Department of Public Health and the local county health departments ensure standards in several environmental and health-related service areas to protect the public from injury and the spread of disease. These health protection activities include health regulations enforcement, complaint investigations, and permitting, licensing, and inspections for the following:

- Foodservice/retail/processors/temporary events
- Hotel/motels including hotel/motel pools/spas/hot tubs, and camps
- Jails/prisons
- Body art facilities
- Individual onsite small flow systems
- Subdivision large flow developments/systems
- Onsite sewage systems
- Septic tank/grease trap/holding tank
- Septic tank manufacturers/pumpers/land application
- Solid waste facilities/vehicles
- Rabies and vector control/bite investigations/testing
- Public health nuisance complaint investigations
- Community sanitation investigations
- Private water well testing
- Food safety training classes
- ServSafe food safety certification
- State of Alabama Environmental Rules Training

Some environmental services require a fee to be submitted prior to the service being performed.

== Programs and Services ==
The Alabama Department of Public Health's Central Office is organized into bureaus that focus on a number of health-related issues, including disease prevention and control, emergency medical services, emergency preparedness, environmental services, family health, health care access, home and community health, injury prevention, and regulation and licensure. The department publishes over 90 health-related pamphlets available to Alabama residents. The topics range from injury prevention to environmental health, nutrition and physical activity, tobacco prevention, emergency preparedness, sexually transmitted diseases, chronic disease, and communicable diseases.

== Supporting Agencies ==
- Alabama Department of Education
- Alabama Department of Environmental Management
- Alabama Department of Transportation

== See also ==
- Government of Alabama
