= Seal of the vice president of the United States =

Versions
- Former seal, used from 1948 to 1975.
- Armiger: Vice President of the United States
- Adopted: 1975
- Crest: Behind and above the eagle a radiating glory or, on which appears an arc of thirteen cloud puffs gray, and a constellation of thirteen mullets gray
- Shield: Paleways of thirteen pieces argent and gules, a chief azure
- Supporters: An American eagle displayed holding in his dexter talon an olive branch proper and in his sinister a bundle of thirteen arrows gray, and in his beak a gray scroll inscribed E PLURIBUS UNUM sable
- Motto: E pluribus unum
- Use: On documents from the vice president to members of government, and as a symbol on vice presidential vehicles, podiums, and other places

The seal of the vice president of the United States is used to mark correspondence from the U.S. vice president to other members of government, and is also used as a symbol of the vice presidency. The central design, directly based on the seal of the president of the United States (and indirectly on the Great Seal of the United States), is the official coat of arms of the U.S. vice presidency and also appears on the vice presidential flag.

There are virtually no records on early vice presidential seals, but there were versions in use as early as 1846 and almost certainly earlier as well. There was no official definition of a vice presidential seal until 1948, and today's version dates from 1975 when it was redesigned under President Ford.

== Design and symbolism ==
The current seal is defined in Executive Order 11884, made by President Gerald Ford on October 7, 1975. It states:

The Coat of Arms of the Vice President of the United States shall be of the following design:

SHIELD: Paleways of thirteen pieces argent and gules, a chief azure; upon the breast of an American eagle displayed holding in his dexter talon an olive branch proper and in his sinister a bundle of thirteen arrows gray, and in his beak a gray scroll inscribed "E PLURIBUS UNUM" sable.
CREST: Behind and above the eagle a radiating glory or, on which appears an arc of thirteen cloud puffs gray, and a constellation of thirteen mullets gray.

The Seal of the Vice President of the United States shall consist of the Coat of Arms encircled by the words "Vice President of the United States."

The blazon (written design) is exactly the same as the seal of the president of the United States, except that there is no surrounding ring of stars, and four elements—the clouds and stars above the eagles head, the scroll, and the arrows—are specifically colored gray to differentiate them; in the president's seal these are "proper", argent, white, and proper respectively. Obviously, the surrounding legends on the seals are different as well. The official line drawings are likewise virtually identical; the most noticeable difference is that the center tail feather is slightly shorter in the vice presidential version, which was perhaps inadvertent. The primary differences are seen in color prints; the background of the vice presidential seal is white where the presidential seal uses dark blue, and the chief (top third) of the shield is typically dark blue in the vice presidential seal whereas the presidential seal uses light blue. Because the vice presidential coat of arms does not have a ring of stars around it, the other elements are made relatively larger to fill the space, so when placed side-by-side the eagle on the vice presidential seal is noticeably larger than its presidential counterpart.

In turn, the written designs of both the presidential and vice presidential coats of arms are also essentially the same as the obverse of the Great Seal of the United States as defined in 1782, though with a different arrangement of the stars, clouds, and glory than is typically seen in modern versions of the Great Seal. Likewise, the symbolism follows that of the Great Seal:

- The stripes on the shield represent the 13 original states, unified under and supporting the chief. The motto (meaning "Out of many, one") alludes to the same concept.
- The arc of thirteen clouds, and the thirteen stars, also refer to the original 13 states.
- The olive branch and arrows denote the powers of peace and war.

== Uses of the seal ==
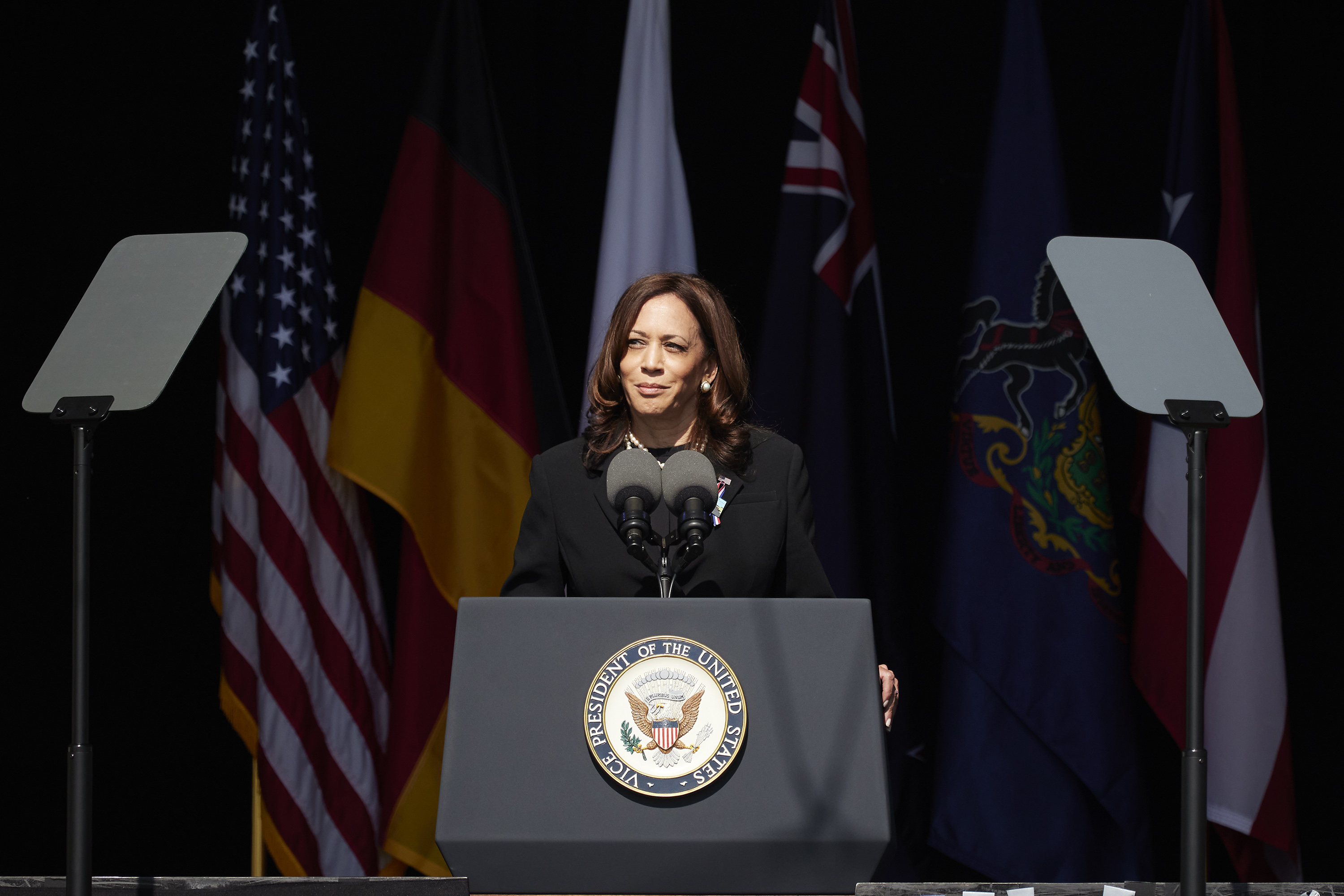
Vice President Kamala Harris in 2021, with the vice presidential seal on the podium

Strictly speaking, the brass die in the vice president's office is the only actual seal of the vice president, and it is used to mark official documents and correspondence with wax impressions. It is 1 3/4 in (4.4 cm) in diameter. Other versions are technically "facsimiles"; the Bureau of Engraving and Printing has several other dies used to imprint the seal, or coat of arms, on stationery, invitations, and the like as requested by the vice president.

Other versions of the seal are often used as a visual symbol to represent the vice president, and are most often seen on lecterns when they make a speech, and on the sides of presidential transports such as Air Force Two, Marine Two, and limousines. The coat of arms, without the surrounding inscription, is used on the Vice Presidential Service Badge and the vice presidential flag.

=== Regulated use ===
In general, commercial use of the seal is prohibited by 18 USC 713 of the United States Code, and further defined by Executive Orders 11916 and 11649, the same statutes which protect the seal of the president of the United States.

== History ==
The early history of the vice president's seal remains obscure, as seal historians have largely ignored it, and there is virtually no information on early usage. Similar to the presidential seal, the primary usage appears to have been to seal the envelopes for correspondence from the vice president, and the envelopes were presumably discarded even if the correspondence was kept, so there is little record remaining.

=== Early seals ===
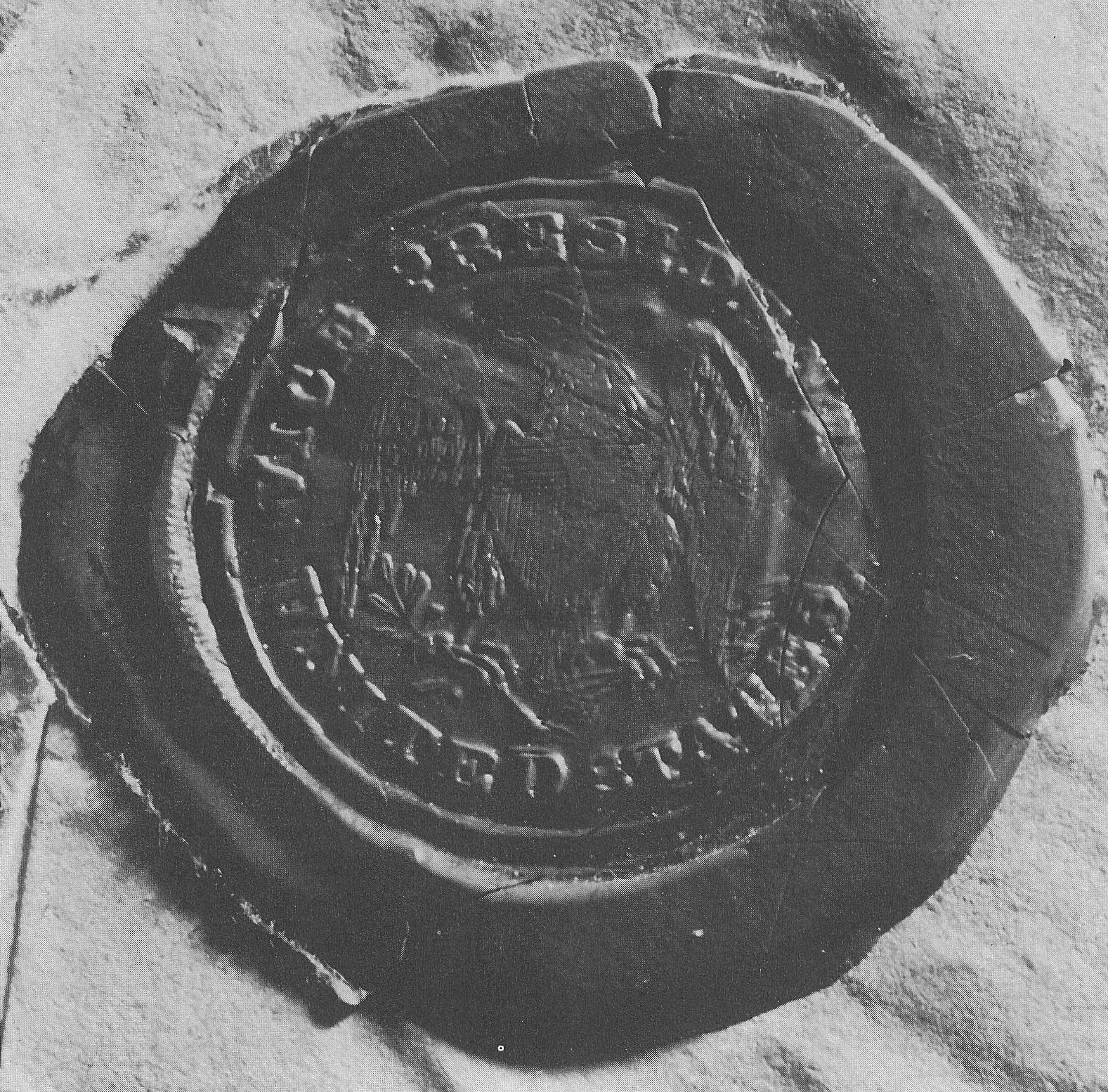
1850 impression of the vice president's seal

The earliest known reference to a vice presidential seal was in a November 6, 1846 letter from the chief clerk of the United States Senate, William Hickey, to a Maryland seal engraver named Edward Stabler (who had made many seals for the government, and would make one for the president a few years later). The letter also indicates that the vice presidential seal was not new at the time.

Only one impression of an early vice presidential seal has been found, that on the envelope of a January 26, 1850 letter from Vice President Millard Fillmore to the chairman of the Senate Committee of Post Offices and Post Roads concerning the nomination of a postmaster. The seal was of red wax, and about the size of a nickel (which is 0.835 in or 2.12 cm). The central design is basically a version of the national coat of arms; it shows an eagle with wings "displayed and inverted" (i.e., wing tips pointing down), with its head turned toward dexter (its own right). In its right talon is an olive branch, and its left holds six arrows (just like the incorrectly drawn 1841 Great Seal die). The shield has the usual blue chief and thirteen white and red stripes. At the top is the legend VICE PRESIDENT, and the bottom has UNITED STATES.

No other impression of a vice presidential seal is known prior to the 1948 version.

=== 1948 seal ===
1948 vice presidential seal

The presidential seal and flag were redesigned in 1945, and since the vice president's flag at the time was a reversed-color variation of the presidential flag, it was noted that the vice presidential seal and flag should also be redesigned. Since applying the previous reversed-color concept to the seal as well would result in the design being too indistinguishable from the president's version, in August 1945 Truman asked the Heraldic Branch of the Office of the Quartermaster General of the Army to "prepare several sketches" for a new vice presidential flag. However, since the vice presidency was vacant at the time, there was no need for an immediate change.

In 1948, a new vice president would be elected, and during the fall an executive order was prepared to prescribe the new seal and flag for the office. It was suggested to delay the order until after the election, so accordingly President Truman issued Executive Order 10016 on November 10, 1948, which officially defined the vice presidential seal for the first time (Executive Order 7285 of 1936 had defined a vice presidential flag, but not the seal).

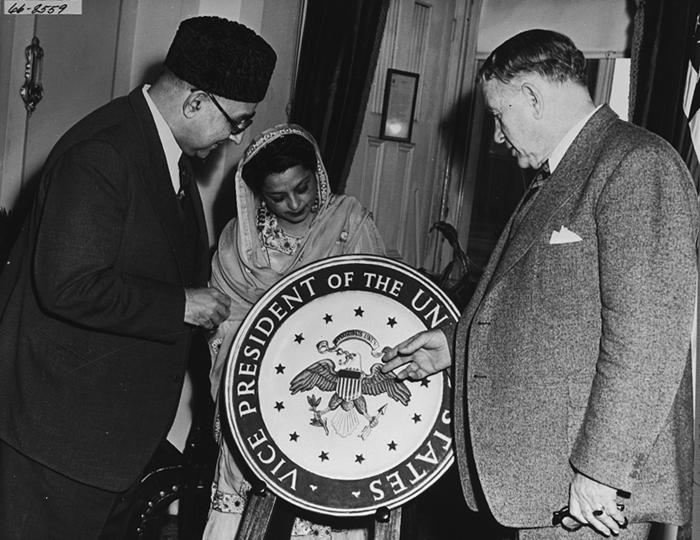
Vice President Alben Barkley showing the seal to Prime Minister of Pakistan Liaquat Ali Khan and his wife, Begum Ra'ana Liaquat Ali Khan

The design was still a variation on the U.S. coat of arms and therefore the presidential seal, but was made to be distinctly different. While the shield is the same, the eagle's wings are more outstretched, with the wing tips pointing slightly down ("inverted", in heraldic terms). The eagle's right talon holds an olive branch, though with fewer leaves and berries than the depiction used in the 1945 presidential seal, and the left talon holds a single arrow (rather than the 13 specified in both the presidential and Great Seals). While the 1945 presidential seal added a ring of 48 stars around the eagle (representing the states), a ring of 13 stars (representing the original 13 colonies) was added to the 1948 vice presidential seal. The design has some resemblance to the one known 1850 seal, but there is no evidence that the 1948 designer had any knowledge of the earlier version. The actual drawings for the executive order were prepared by Miss Elizabeth Will, of the Heraldic Branch, Office of the Quartermaster General, Department of the Army.

The full set of seal dies was not completed by the Bureau of Engraving and Printing until 1952, and a replacement was made in 1969. Similar to the situation with the president's seal, there were several seal dies. The official die is brass and attached to a handle, and used by the vice president's office to affix wax impressions to correspondence and official documents. The Bureau of Engraving and Printing had several steel dies ranging in size from 5/8 to 1 3/4 inches (1.6 to 4.4 cm) used to imprint invitations, stationery, and the like as requested by the vice president.

This seal took practical effect when Alben W. Barkley was inaugurated as Vice President on January 20, 1949, and remained in use for nearly 27 years.

=== 1975 seal ===
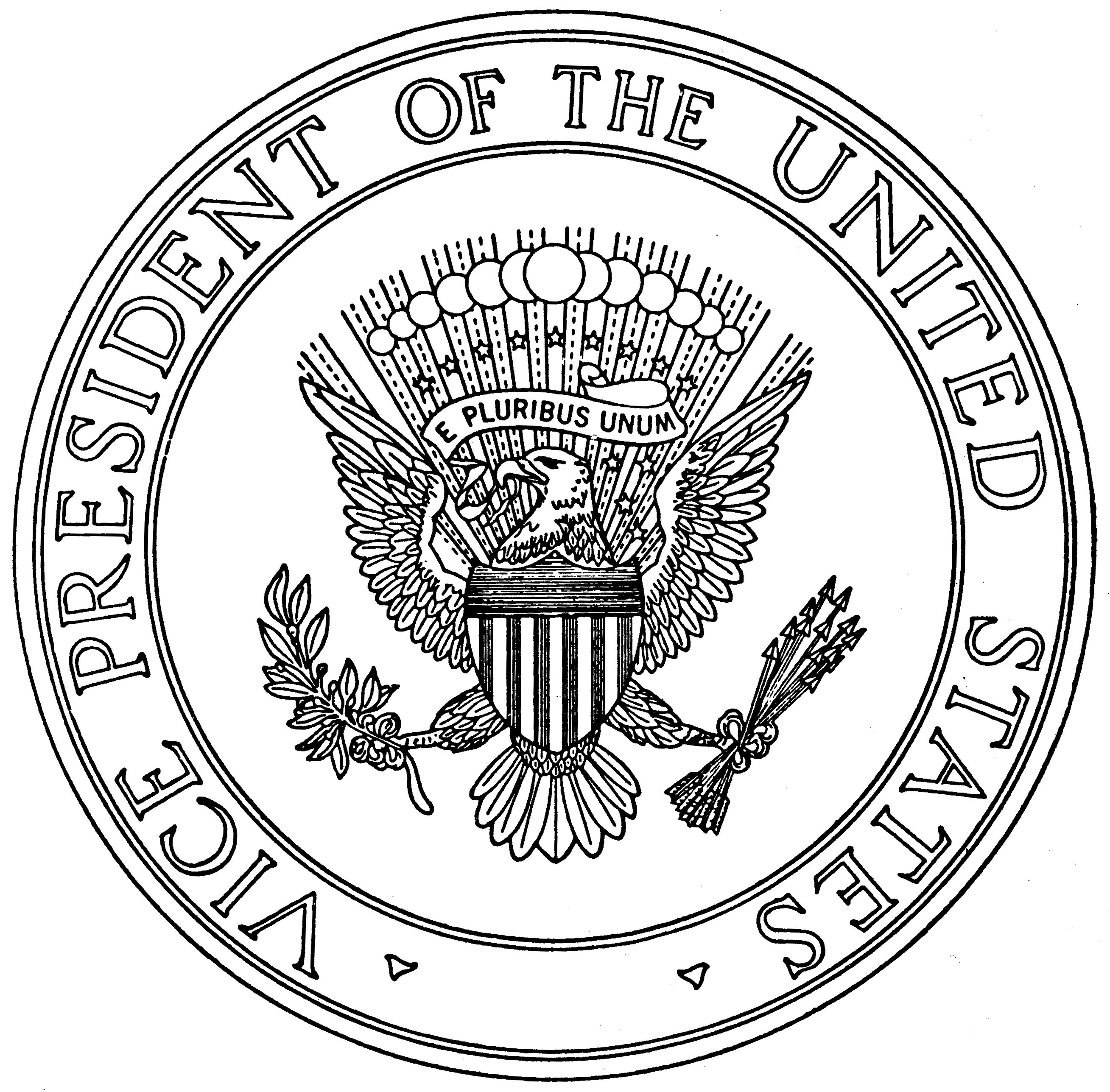
Illustration from 1975 executive order

Some of the subsequent vice presidents disliked the design of the 1948 seal. Hubert Humphrey would often remark that the relative importance of the vice president's office could be gauged by the "droopy eagle" on the seal, and Nelson Rockefeller (appointed by Gerald Ford) said in public it was "aesthetically very weak" and in private complained to friends it looked like a "wounded quail" (or in some versions of the story a "wounded partridge").

Rockefeller set out to get the seal changed. With Ford's permission, he asked the Army's Institute of Heraldry to come up with a new design. After several months of work, where about twenty models were rejected, Ford issued Executive Order 11884 on October 29, 1975, which redefined the coat of arms, seal, and flag of the vice president.

The new design was a much fuller eagle, with thirteen arrows and a full olive branch. The ring of stars was removed, but otherwise the written description (blazon) as well as the actual drawings were essentially identical to the presidential coat of arms, except for some differences in the colors. The official drawings and paintings were made by illustrators in the Design and Illustration Division of the Institute of Heraldry, U.S. Army, under the supervision of Charles A. Reynolds.

The Bureau of Engraving and Printing completed the actual seal dies in July 1976. There were two seal dies made with counterdies and hand presses in order to affix wax impressions to official documents; one in the vice president's office and one in the Senate. These were 1 3/4 inches (4.4 cm) in diameter. The Bureau also made seven smaller stamping dies, ranging in size from 3/8 to 3/4 inches (0.95 to 1.91 cm), used to imprint facsimiles on invitations, stationery, and the like.

Rockefeller was pleased with the result; he wrote Ford a thank you note which mentioned "as you know, art and aesthetics are my weakness". The seal has not been changed since.

== See also ==
- Flag of the vice president of the United States
- Seal of the president of the United States
- Seals of governors of the U.S. states and territories
- Great Seal of the United States
