= Distinctive unit insignia =

Badge or device worn by soldiers in the United States Army

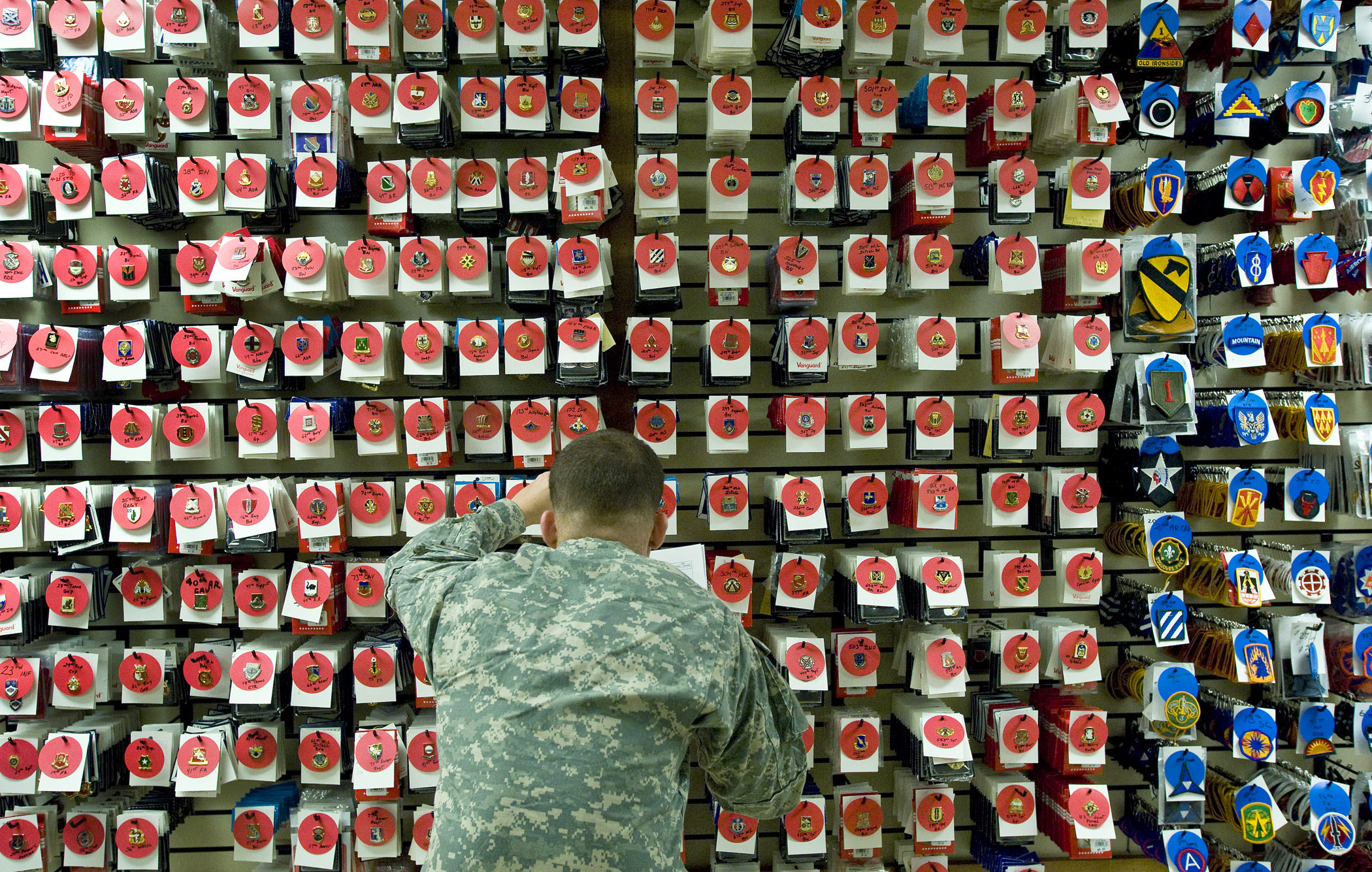
A soldier inventories all the DUIs at the Charles C. Carson Center for Mortuary Affairs

A distinctive unit insignia (DUI) is a metallic heraldic badge or device worn by soldiers in the United States Army. The DUI design is derived from the coat of arms authorized for a unit. DUIs may also be called "distinctive insignia" (DI) or, imprecisely, a "crest" or a "unit crest" by soldiers or collectors. The U.S. Army Institute of Heraldry is responsible for the design, development and authorization of all DUIs.

== History ==
Memorandum authorizing the distinctive unit insignia for the 337th Infantry Regiment

=== Pre–World War I insignia ===
Distinctive ornamentation of a design desired by the organization was authorized for wear on the Mess Jacket uniform by designated organizations (staff corps, departments, corps of artillery, and infantry and cavalry regiments) per War Department General Order 132 dated December 31, 1902. The distinctive ornamentation was described later as coats of arms, pins and devices. The authority continued until omitted in the Army uniform regulation dated December 26, 1911.

=== Distinctive unit insignia ===
War Department Circular 161, dated 29 April 1920, authorized the use of a regimental coat of arms or badge as approved by the War Department for wear on the collar of the white uniform and the lapels of the mess jacket. War Department Circular 244, 1921 states: "It has been approved, in principle, that regiments of the Regular Army and National Guard may wear distinctive badges or trimmings on their uniforms as a means of promoting esprit de corps and keeping alive historical traditions. Various organizations which carry colors or standards have generally submitted coats of arms having certain historical significance. As fast as they are approved, these coats of arms will form the basis for regimental colors or standards which will eventually replace the present regimental colors or standards when these wear out. The use of these coats of arms as collar ornaments in lieu of the insignia of corps, departments, or arms of service would be an example of distinctive badge to be worn by the regiment."

The first unit to wear this insignia was the 51st Artillery which received approval for wear on March 18, 1922. It was designed by Master Gunner and Master Sergeant Edward C. Kuhn, the artist responsible for creating all authorized coats of arms and distinctive unit insignia at the time.

=== Present ===
Up until 1965, only regiments and separate battalions were authorized a coat of arms and distinctive units insignia. Today, all major commands, field hospitals, corps, logistics commands and certain other units – groups, for example – are authorized distinctive unit insignia.

== Design ==
The Institute of Heraldry's manufacturing instructions for the 337th Infantry Regiment's DUI

The unit commanding officer requests approval of a distinctive unit insignia. A check is made by the Institute of Heraldry to determine the availability of a current copy of the lineage and honor statement and/or history for the unit. If it is not available, one is requested from the United States Army Center of Military History. The unit's history is reviewed to determine if the unit may inherit a previously-approved distinctive unit insignia, or if a new design should be made.

If a new design is to be made, careful study is made of the history and battle honors of the unit. The most important decorations, honors, combat service and missions are represented in the design of the insignia. Sometimes two centuries of history are condensed into symbolism for one distinctive unit insignia. A proposed design is created and sent to the commanding officer for review and concurrence. Upon concurrence by the unit commander, an official letter of approval of the distinctive unit insignia is sent to the unit.

Manufacturing drawings and specifications are sent to a certified manufacturer, which provides samples of the finished distinctive unit insignia to the Institute of Heraldry for approval. Once approved, the manufacturer may produce the insignia. Each manufacturer has an identifying hallmark assigned by the Institute of Heraldry, which is applied to the back of the insignia.

The shield shape design is used to identify color-bearing organizations (for example, regiments and battalions). Other design patterns will be used for non-color-bearing units. The design is based on war service, assignment or accomplishments. Cartoon characters or logos are not authorized as design elements. Symbols are to represent the unit's mission rather than actual equipment, as equipment inevitably becomes outdated. Unit designations, numerals, letters, geographical outlines, reproductions of other insignia will not be included as part of the design.

Once a distinctive unit insignia is approved, it is changed only when a heraldic or historical error is found. A modification of unit designation or mission does not permit a change to the DUI design. As a result, DUIs tend to further reflect the historic roots of a unit. For example, many older Military Intelligence battalions' DUIs feature teal blue rather than oriental blue, having been designed for Army Security Agency units. which were designated as branch-immaterial. Likewise, those that began as Signals units typically feature orange. The 211th Military Police Battalion provides an example of a unit changing branches without changing insignia, having been assigned to six different branches during its existence. Color-bearing battalions and regiments continue to have insignia without the shield shape if they were formerly non-color-bearing units when the insignia was approved. That includes not only former groups and brigades that were downsized but also flexible battalions (battalions composed of variable attached numbered companies, rather than fixed-TOE battalions composed of lettered companies organic to the battalion), which gained coats of arms and thus colors in the late 1990s, long after their DUIs were already approved.

== Authorization ==
Distinctive unit insignia (DUI) of a design approved by the Institute of Heraldry, U.S. Army, are authorized under Paragraph 28-22 of Army Regulation 670–1.

== Wear ==
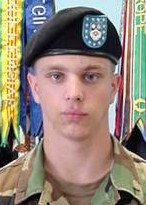
A U.S. Army soldier wearing the black beret with the DUI of the 23rd Infantry Regiment.

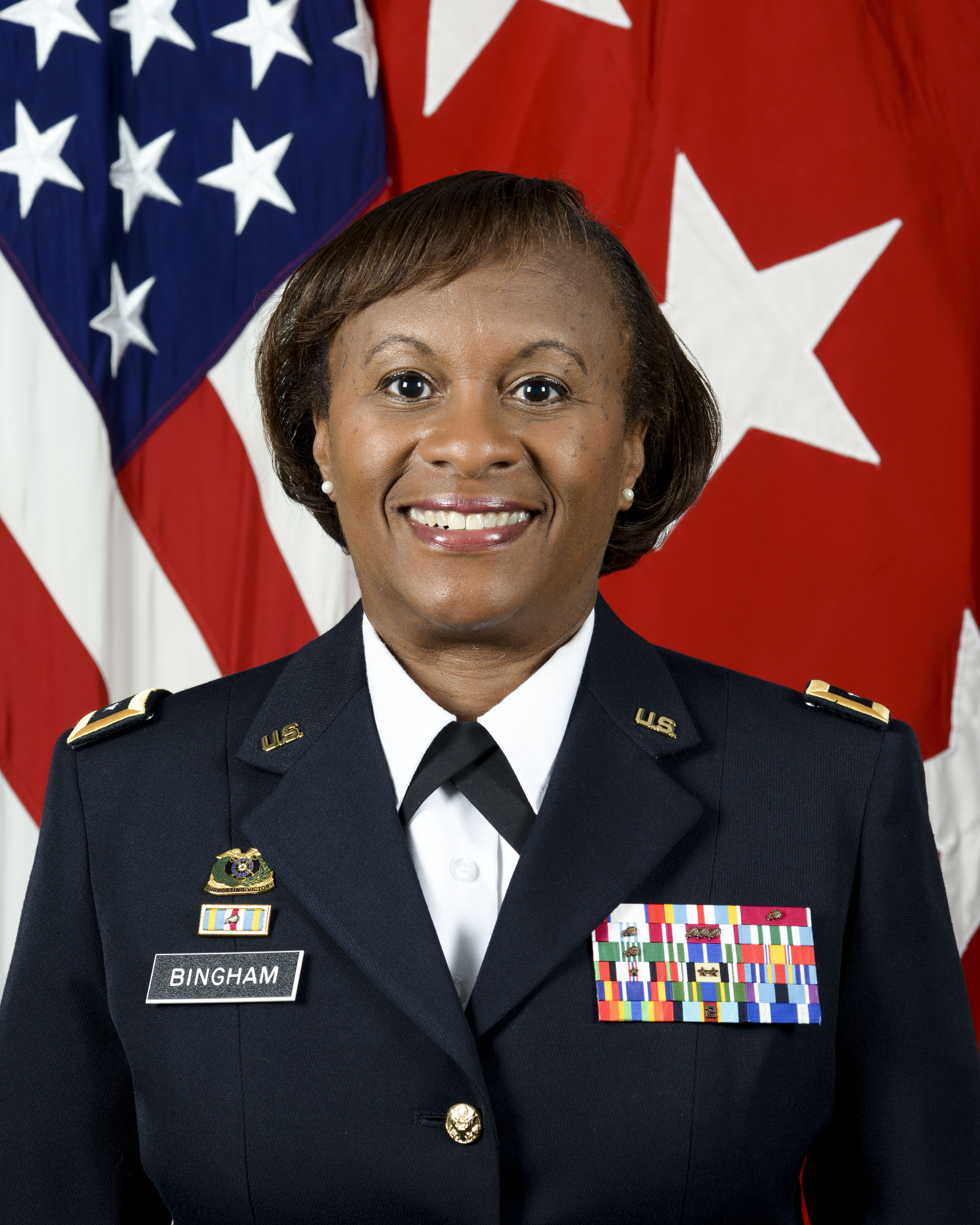
U.S. Army Lieutenant General Gwen Bingham wearing the Quartermaster Corps RDI on the Army Service Uniform.

The distinctive unit insignia of the unit to which the soldier is assigned are worn as follows:

- On the beret flash of enlisted personnel
- On the breast patch of the black pullover sweater
- On the shoulder loops of the enlisted personnel's Army Service Uniform jacket (when not worn in dress configuration), centered on the shoulder loops an equal distance from the outside shoulder seam to the outside edge of the button, with the base of the insignia toward the outside shoulder seam.
- Above the nameplate on the Class A and Class B service uniforms, when the DUI is worn in lieu of a regimental distinctive insignia (RDI). At the soldier's option the RDI, the DUI of their current assignment or the DUI of a previous assignment may be worn above the nameplate. If worn, the RDI for whole branch regiments (MP, Signal, Quartermaster) must be that of the soldier's current career field.

When a DUI is authorized, all personnel assigned to the organization wear the insignia, except general officers, the Sergeant Major of the Army and the Senior Enlisted Advisor to the Chairman. General officers wear their regimental distinctive insignia (RDI) on the black pullover sweater. The Sergeant Major of the Army and Senior Enlisted Advisor to the Chairman (if a soldier) wear, respectively, the SMA and SEAC collar insignia in lieu of the DUI on their pullover sweaters and berets, but their epaulets are bare.

Units not listed in AR 670-1 (other than USAG) may request a DUI be authorized if the unit has at least 500 military personnel assigned (250 for Department of the Army operating agencies). The Army element of joint commands may be authorized a DUI if the Army element has at least 500 Army personnel.

== Examples ==
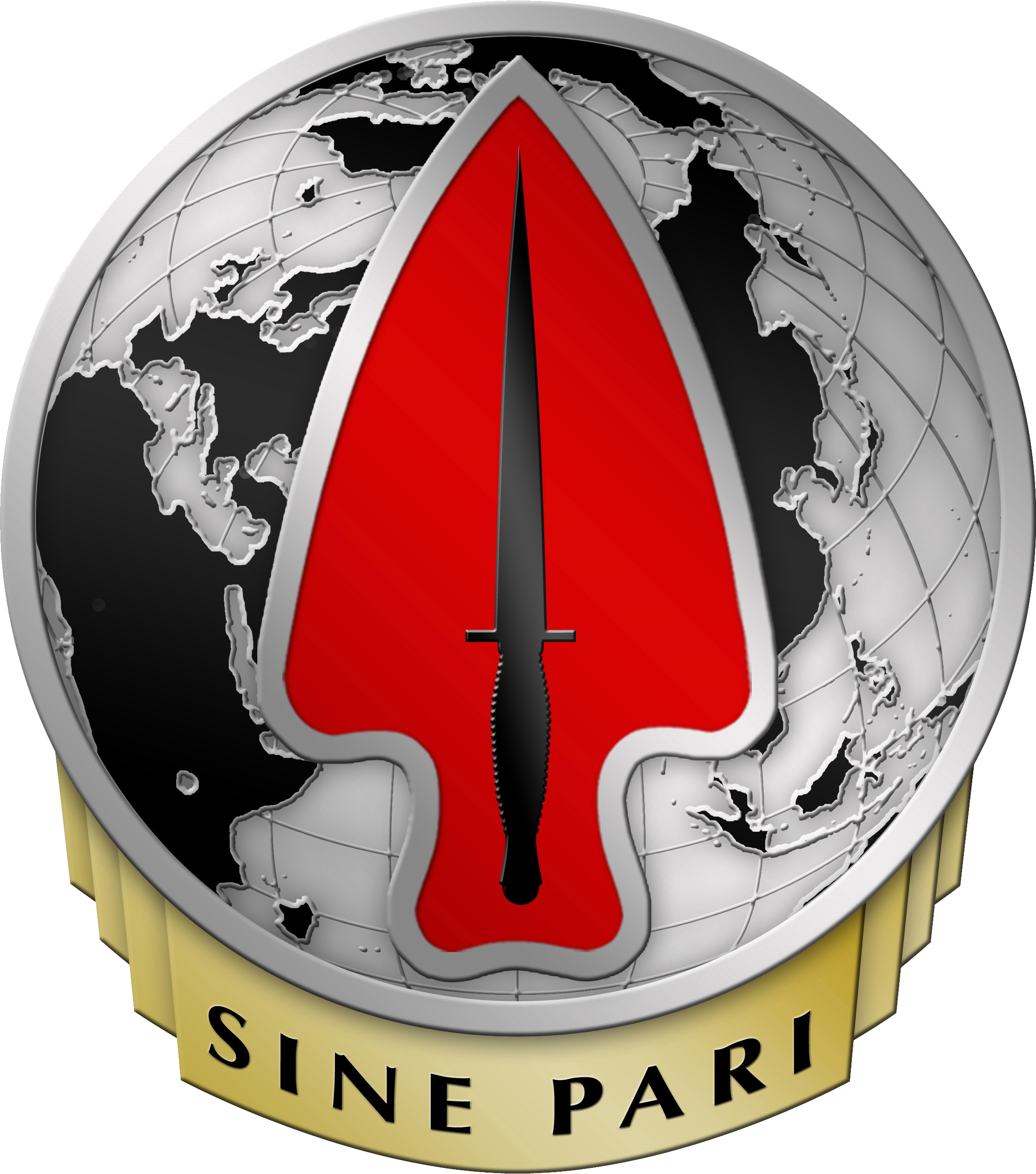
US Army Special Operations Command
"Sine Pari"
(Without Equal)

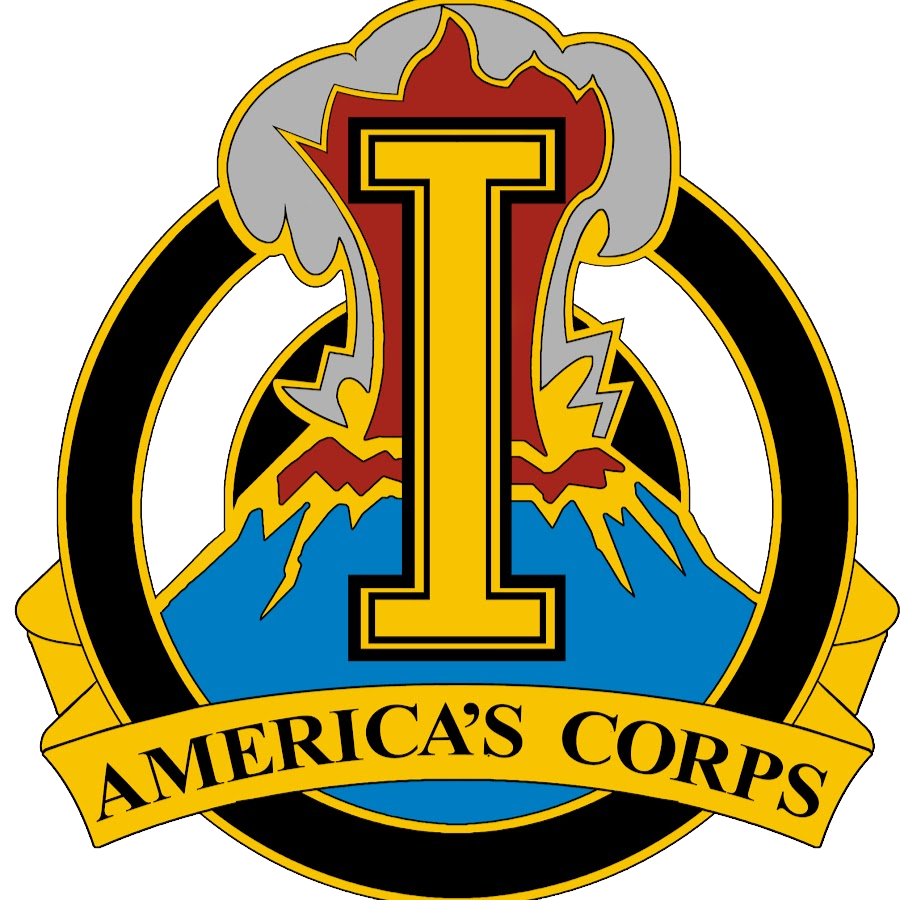
I Corps
"America's Corps"

3rd Infantry Division
"Nous Resterons La"
(We Shall Remain Here)

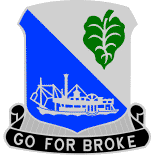
442nd Infantry Regiment
"Go for Broke"

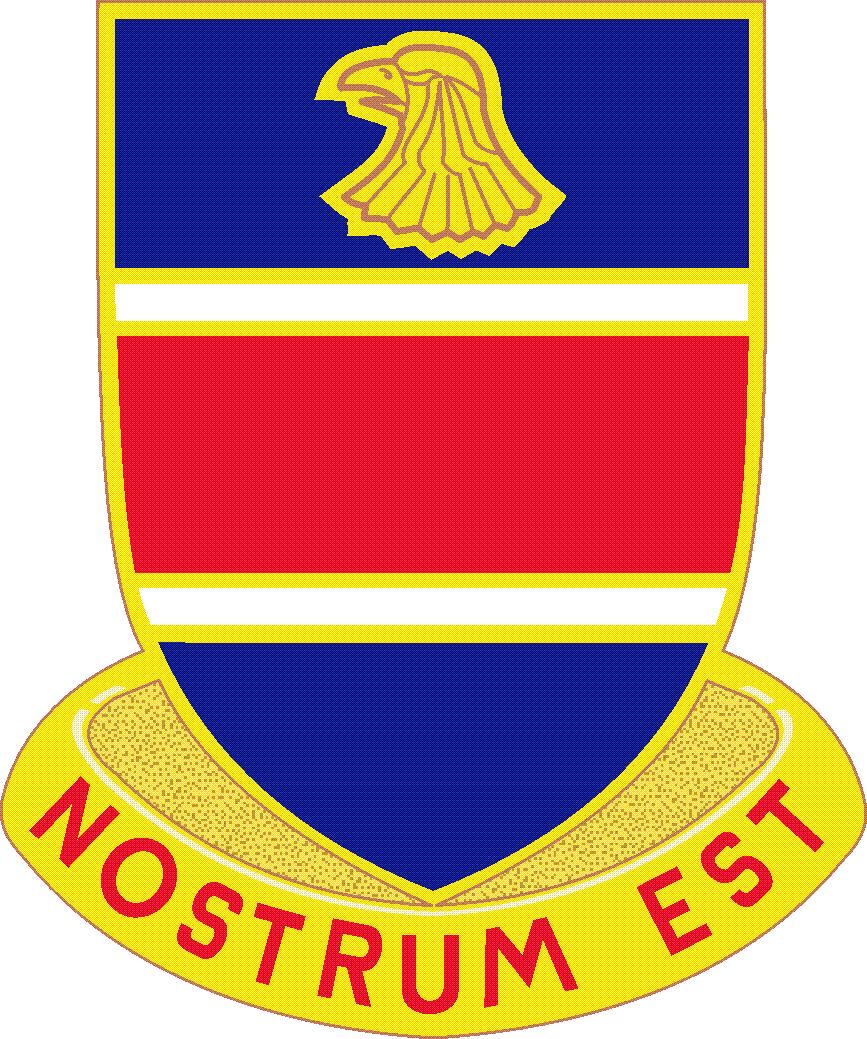
326th Engineer Battalion
"Nostrum Est"
(The Task Is Ours)

== See also ==
- Shoulder sleeve insignia – which describes the unit formation patches worn on the upper left and right sleeves below the shoulder hem.

AR-670-1 - Guide to the Wear and Appearance of Army Uniforms and Insignia (May 25, 2017)

- United States military beret flash
- Heraldic badge
- Emblems of the United States Air Force
