= 51st Coast Artillery Regiment =

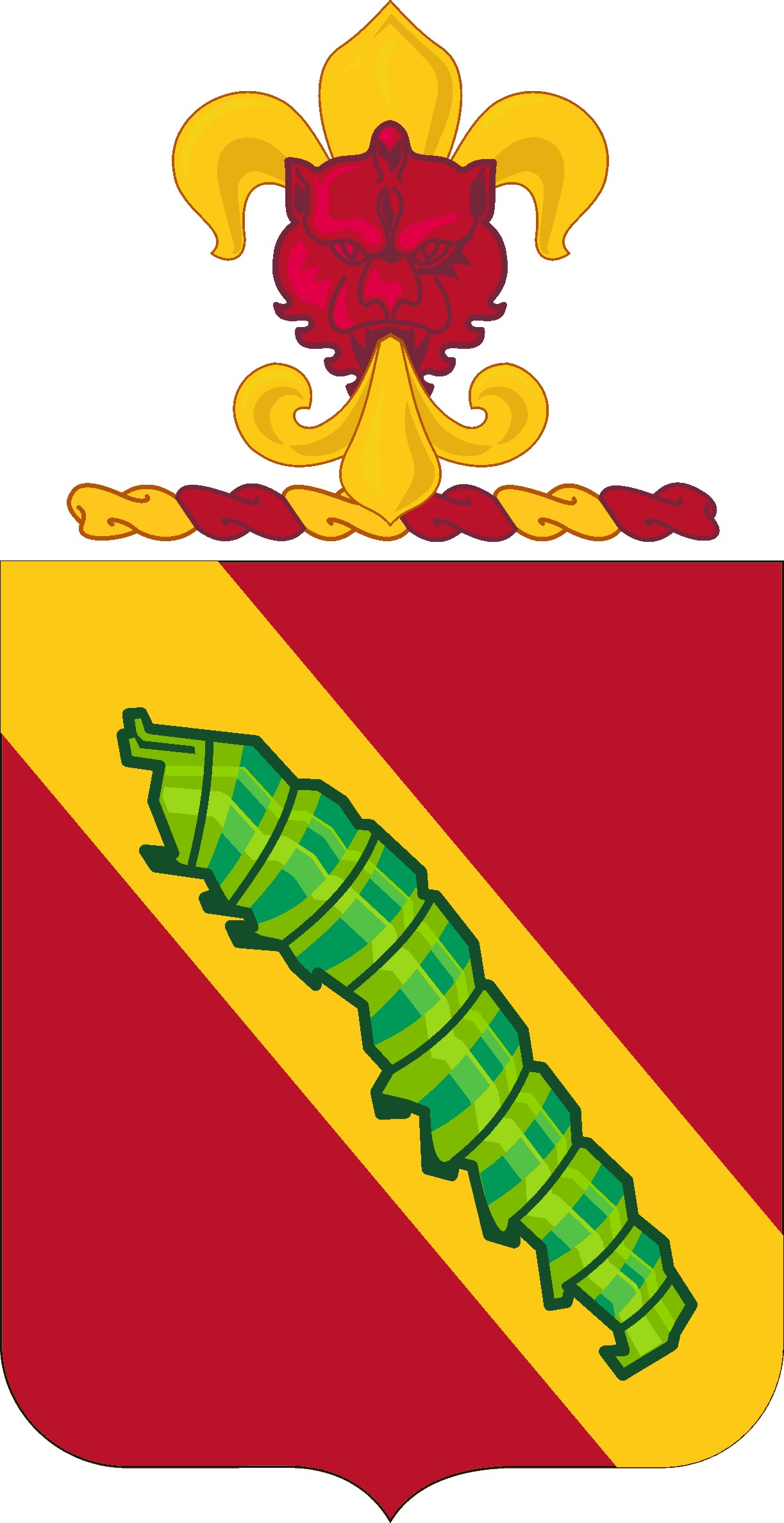
- 51st Coast Artillery Regiment Coat of Arms
- Active: 1917 – 1944
- Country: United States
- Branch: Army
- Type: Coast artillery
- Role: Tractor drawn
- Size: Regiment
- Motto: "En Avant" (Forward)
- Mascot: Oozlefinch
- Decorations: Philippine Republic Presidential Unit Citation

Insignia
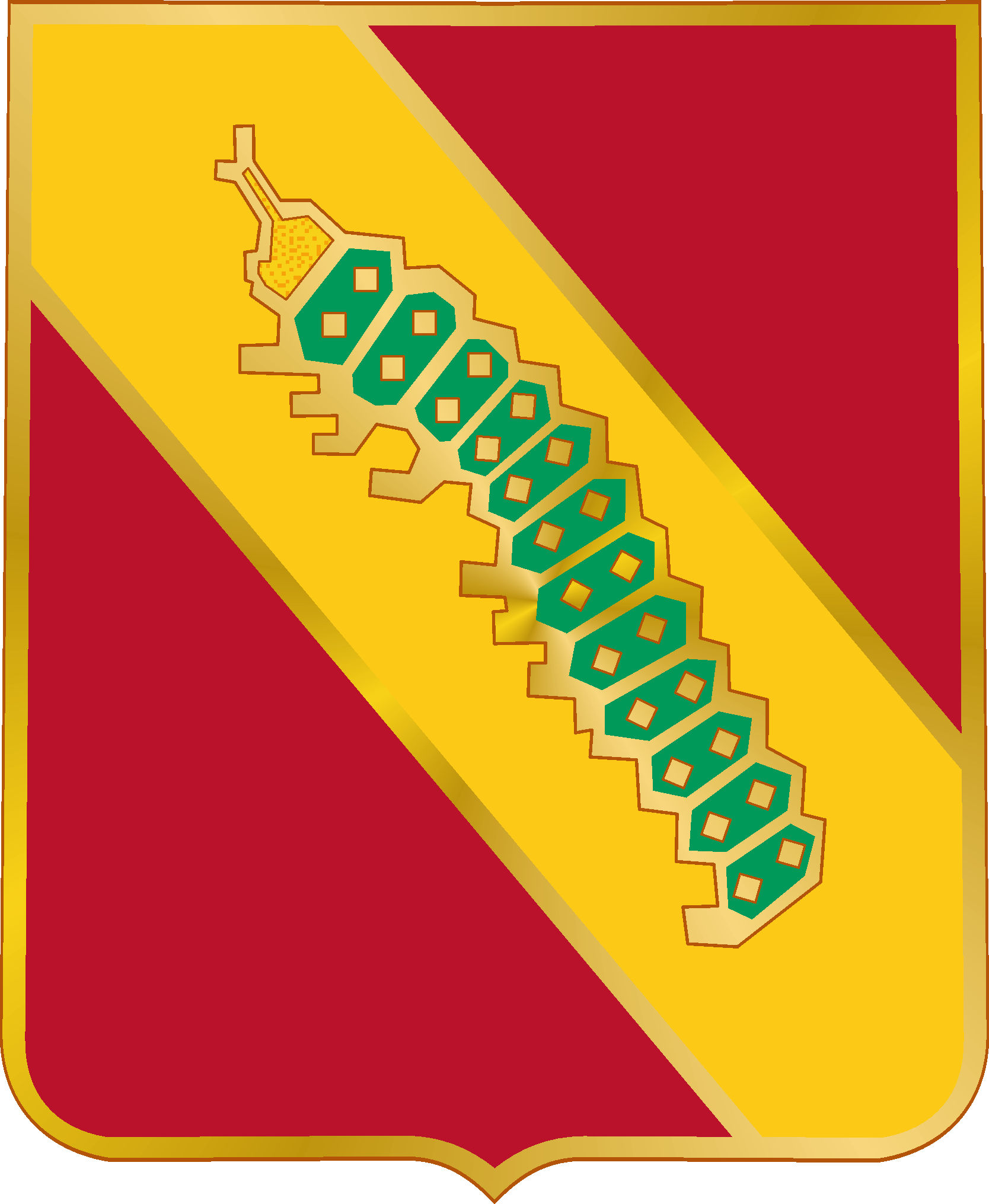
- Distinctive unit insignia

The 51st Coast Artillery Regiment was a Coast Artillery regiment in the United States Army.

== Lineage ==
Constituted in July 1917 under the designation of the 6th Provisional Regiment, Coast Artillery Corps at Fort Adams, RI from the following companies-

- Headquarters Company 2nd Co. at Fort Mott, NJ formed in June 1917
- Supply Company 2nd Co. at Fort Mott, NJ formed in June 1917
- Battery A 1st Co. at Fort McKinley, ME originally organized in 1808
- Battery B 2nd Co. at Fort Greble, RI originally organized in 1901
- Battery C 3rd Co. at Fort Strong, MA originally organized in 1847
- Battery D 5th Co. at Fort McKinley, ME organized in April 1917
- Battery E 1st Co. at Fort Preble, ME originally organized in 1901
- Battery F 4th Co. at Fort Williams, ME originally organized in 1901
- Battery G 3rd Co. at Fort Williams, ME originally organized in 1861
- Battery H 2nd Co. at Fort Williams, ME originally organized in 1812
- Battery I 2nd Co. at Fort Andrews, MA originally organized in 1907
- Battery K 1st Co. Fort Banks, MA originally organized in 1813
- Battery L 3rd Co. at Fort Andrews, MA originally organized in 1907
- Battery M 4th Co. at Fort Andrews, MA originally organized in 1916

arrived in France 11 September 1917 and redesignated 51st Artillery (Coast Artillery Corps) on 5 February 1918.

(In August 1918 the Railway Artillery Reserve was reconstructed and Coast Artillery Regiments reorganized to conform to standardized Field Artillery configurations)

- HHB as HHB
- Battery A as Battery A 51st Artillery
- Battery B as Battery B 51st Artillery
- Battery C redesignated as Battery C 43rd artillery
- Battery D redesignated as Battery D 43rd artillery
- Battery E redesignated as Battery E 43rd artillery
- Battery F redesignated as Battery C 57th Artillery
- Battery G redesignated as Battery D 57th Artillery
- Battery H redesignated as Battery F 43rd Artillery
- Battery I redesignated as Battery C 44th Artillery
- Battery K redesignated as Battery D 44th Artillery
- Battery L redesignated as Battery C 51st Artillery
- Battery M redesignated as Battery D 51st Artillery
- Batteries E and G 53rd Artillery transferred to 51st as Batteries E and F.

The 51st had a mixed armament in France: the 1st Battalion with six French-made tractor-drawn 240 mm howitzers, the 2nd Battalion with eight French-made 270 mm mortars (on fixed mounts, moved on narrow-gauge railways), and the 3rd Battalion with eight British-made tractor-drawn 8-inch howitzers. After the Armistice the regiment turned in its heavy equipment and was moved back to the United States, where it was rearmed with 24 8-inch howitzers.

51st Coast Artillery arrived New York City 3 February 1919 and moved to Camp Mills then reassigned to Fort Hamilton, then reassigned on 15 October 1919 to Camp Jackson, SC.

- on 31 July 1921 2nd and 3rd Battalions HHB inactivated at Camp Jackson.
- Battery C 56th Artillery redesignated as 2nd Battalion HHD&CT 51st Artillery on 1 August 1921.

On 22 October 1921 51st Artillery reassigned to Camp Eustis, VA.

- On 1 July 1924 51st Artillery, CAC, redesignated as 51st Coast Artillery (TD) Regiment, armed with 24 155 mm guns.

51st Coast Artillery reassigned to Fort Monroe on 8 May 1931.

- 1st Battalion reassigned to Camp Buchanan, San Juan, PR. on 20 October 1939.

51st Coast Artillery Regiment Redesignated 51st Coast artillery (155mm Gun)(Semi-Mobile) Regiment on 8 March 1942, and 2nd Battalion authorized.

- 2nd Battalion HHB, Battery C, and 3rd platoon Battery G (SL) activated at Borinquen Army Airfield on 16 March 1942
- Battery D 2nd Battalion activated at Borinquen Airfield 1 May 1942.

HHB 1st Battalion, Battery B and Battery G reassigned to Port of Spain, Trinidad on 8 December 1943 followed by 2nd Battalion HHB, and Batteries A, C, and D.

On 1 June 1944 the regiment is broken up into Battalions as Follows-

- 1st Battalion reorganized and redesignated as 51st Coast Artillery (155mm Gun)(Semi Mobile) Battalion.
- 2nd Battalion reorganized and redesignated as 52nd Coast Artillery (155mm Gun)(Semi Mobile) Battalion.
- HHB 51st CA redesignated as the 145th Coast Artillery Group.
- Battery G inactivated and disbanded. 12 June 1944.

On 28 February 1946 51st and 52nd Coast artillery Battalions deactivated and disbanded.

== Distinctive unit insignia ==
- Description

A Gold color metal and enamel device 1 1/4 inches (3.2 cm) in height overall consisting of a shield blazoned: Gules on a bend Or a caterpillar passant Vert.

- Symbolism

The field of the shield is red, the Artillery color. Service in Lorraine is shown by the bend, a distinctive feature of the Lorraine arms, "Or, a bend Gules," reversing the tinctures. The caterpillar on the bend symbolizes the tractor.

- Background

The distinctive unit insignia was approved on 16 March 1922.

== Coat of arms ==
=== Blazon ===
- Shield

Gules, on a bend Or a caterpillar passant Vert.

- Crest

On a wreath of the colors Or and Gules, a lion's face Gules jessant-de-lis Or. Motto "En Avant" (Forward).

=== Symbolism ===
- Shield

The field of the shield is red, the Artillery color. Service in Lorraine is shown by the bend, a distinctive feature of the Lorraine arms, "Or, a bend Gules," reversing the tinctures. The caterpillar on the bend symbolizes the tractor.

- Crest

The lion's face of the crest commemorates the initial war service of Battery "A" (formerly Battery "A," 1st Artillery) which took part in the War of 1812, and the fleur-de-lis symbolizes the organization of the Regiment for service in France.

=== Background ===
The coat of arms was approved on 5 February 1920.

== Campaign streamers ==
unknown

== Decorations ==
unknown

== See also ==
- Edward C. Kuhn
