= Edward C. Kuhn =

American artist (1872–1948)

Edward C. Kuhn (March 29, 1872 – September 4, 1948) was an American heraldist and official U.S. Army artist who designed the first authorized coats of arms and distinctive unit insignia for the U.S. Army Coast Artillery Corps, Engineer Corps, Cavalry, Infantry, National Guard and other branches. An expert on flags, heraldry, embroidery, and military antiquities, Kuhn made significant contributions to American military history. A number of Kuhn's paintings are included in the permanent collections of the White House, U.S. Naval Academy Museum and the Smithsonian Institution.

== Biography ==
=== Sawmill laborer to soldier ===
Eduart Wilhelm Christian Kuhn was born March 29, 1872, in Martinsville, Niagara County, New York. Martinsville sits on 500 acres (2.0 km^{2}) of land on the Tonawanda Creek, near the Erie Canal in North Tonawanda a suburb of Buffalo, New York. The oldest of eleven children, Kuhn labored in the local sawmill as a young man, but dreamed of becoming a professional painter. He would rush home from work, change clothes, eat dinner, and race to the train station to make the fourteen miles (23 km) trip to Buffalo's Albright-Knox Art Gallery where he attended art school, c. 1900.

Kuhn enlisted in the New York State Volunteers to fight in the Spanish–American War. He later joined the regular infantry, and eventually transferred to the Coast Artillery Corps in 1902. A sergeant in the Fifty-second Company, Kuhn graduated from the School for Master Gunners in 1905. Kuhn frequently relocated and would seek out the local art school or leading commercial artists wherever he went. He studied under George de Forest Brush while stationed near New York City, Eric Pape, a well-known Boston illustrator, and he continued to develop as a painter while stationed in Cuba, Puerto Rico, Panama, Japan, and the Philippines. On October 6, 1909, Kuhn married Julia S. Krull at St. Paul Lutheran Church.

=== Coats of arms & distinctive unit insignia ===
On June 17, 1918, President Woodrow Wilson wrote to Secretary of War Newton D. Baker requesting better quality military medals. This became the responsibility of Colonel Robert E. Wyllie, Coast Artillery Corps, and Chief of the Equipment Branch of the General Staff. According to Wyllie, there was "no official coordinated control or supervision over the designs of arms and badges for organizations prior to their adoption near the end of 1919, thus making them rife with heraldic and historical inaccuracies."

Kuhn's knack for heraldry was discovered while stationed at Fort Hamilton after World War I, when he was asked to design a coat of arms for his company. After studying its history and various reference books, Kuhn produced a design so impressive he was immediately assigned the task of creating one for the regiment. The Coast Artillery Corps had few regiments in 1919, so coats of arms were designed for the various coast defense commands and a small number were authorized distinctive unit insignia. That same year, Kuhn was assigned to duty as an official Army artist responsible for the original designs of insignia and coats of arms for the cavalry, infantry, artillery, engineers, signal corps, and other branches. Most existing active Regular Army, National Guard, and Organized Reserve regiments eventually had a coat of arms approved.

In 1923 Colonel Wyllie and Kuhn collaborated on an article about the history and development of the coats of arms and badges of the Coast Artillery Corps. Kuhn published his own articles and artwork in military history journals as well. Kuhn is credited with the original coat of arms for every regiment in the Coast Artillery Corps, the National Guard of the United States, and the crest of the minuteman of the organized reserves. He also designed the first authorized distinctive unit insignia for the 51st Coast Artillery. An excellent example of his work still used today is the coat of arms and insignia of the 3d Armored Cavalry Regiment, or "Brave Rifles." Many of the coats of arms he developed for the Coast Artillery Corps appear on the Coats of arms of U.S. Air Defense Artillery Regiments page and the United States Army Institute of Heraldry website.

Kuhn at work in his Washington, D.C. office.

Kuhn with coats of arms of the Coast Artillery Corps.

=== Flag paintings ===
Kuhn was particularly interested in the history and evolution of flags from around the world. He studied their development and perfection, and was considered the foremost expert on the topic in the United States. Kuhn is credited with identifying and restoring a flag that was carried at the first inauguration of George Washington. He continued researching, painting and writing about historical flags at his home following his retirement from the Army.

Retired Major General, Marvin C. Demler of the U.S. Air Force, Kuhn's nephew, frequently visited his home in the 1920s. He accompanied "Uncle Ed" on many trips to the art galleries and libraries of Buffalo, where he explained the research process used to develop insignia, coats of arms, and authentic renditions of flags. Demler became one of two Army Air Corps officers to first visit the secret Los Alamos Laboratories of the Manhattan Project, which resulted in the establishment of the famous “Silver Plate Project” to modify B-29 aircraft for delivery of atomic weapons. Demler's military decorations include the Distinguished Service Medal, the Legion of Merit with oak leaf cluster, and the Bronze Star.

In 1966 Demler retrieved a number of paintings from discarded household effects following the death of Agnes Krull, his aunt and Kuhn's sister-in-law. He donated some for public display in appropriate American governmental buildings, including seven that were given to the U.S. Naval Academy Museum for display and preservation of Naval history. A series of six watercolor paintings tracing the development and history of the flag of the president of the United States were donated to the White House, and hung in the Military Aides' room in 1972. In 1977, the Smithsonian received twenty-two of Kuhn's watercolors showing various official American flags with bearers in service uniforms and civilian dress.

President's Flag 1882

President's Standard 1898

President's Flag 1902

President's Standard 1902

President's Standard 1912

President's Standard 1916

Letter from White House Curator

Letter from National Park Service Director

National Park Service Certificate

=== Embroidery ===
Kuhn’s magnum opus is a massive silk embroidery of the coat of arms of the United States (see also Great Seal of the United States) that he stitched in his spare time over fourteen years. Proficient with a needle and thread, as were most soldiers of the day, Kuhn became interested in the intricacies of the art as a corporal. He started with an immense silk field of different shades of white, approximately 4.5 feet (1.4 m) wide by 5 feet (1.5 m) high. Over four fast-paced hours were required to finish a 1/4-inch-wide (6.4 mm) strip across the length of the field. Kuhn sketched the coat of arms on the completed field, before embroidering the rest of the design.

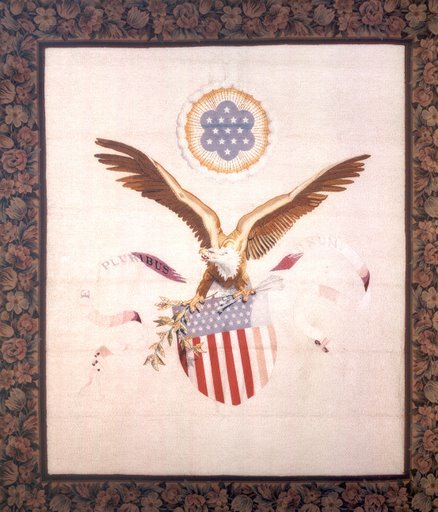
Kuhn's silk embroidery of the coat of arms of the United States.

Kuhn with embroidery.

== Conclusion ==
Edward C. Kuhn made significant contributions to American military art, heraldry, and history. Particularly through his development of early authorized coats of arms and distinctive unit insignia. His life and works are a testament to his patriotism and perseverance. Kuhn died at the age of seventy-six on September 4, 1948, after a long illness. A veteran of two wars, the Spanish–American War and World War I, Kuhn served for thirty years with the Coast Artillery, United States Army. He is buried in the St. Paul Lutheran Cemetery in Martinsville, Niagara County, New York, of which he was the superintendent for many years.

== See also ==
Kuhn, Edward, 202nd New York Infantry in Our Military Heritage – Spanish American War (The Genealogy Center)

White House Historical Association
