= Flag of the vice president of the United States =

Flag used by U.S. vice presidents

Vice President of the United States
- Use: Other
- Proportion: 63:80
- Adopted: October 29, 1975; 51 years ago
- Design: Vice presidential coat of arms defacing white background, four dark blue mullets in each corner

The flag of the vice president of the United States consists of the U.S. vice presidential coat of arms on a white background, with four dark blue stars in the corners. A version of the flag is kept in the vice president's office, is sometimes displayed by the vice president in official photos, and is flown on the vice president's motorcade.

The first official flag for the vice president was specified in 1936, although a special design was used at least twice during the 1910s. The flag has shared the same design as the vice presidential seal since 1948, and the current flag dates from 1975 when it was redesigned during the presidency of Gerald Ford.

== Design ==
The vice president's flag is defined in Executive Order 11884:

The Color and Flag of the Vice President of the United States shall consist of a white rectangular background of sizes and proportions to conform to military custom, on which shall appear the Coat of Arms of the Vice President in proper colors within four blue stars. The proportions of the element of the Coat of Arms shall be in direct relation to the hoist, and the fly shall vary according to the customs of the military services.

Attached to the order were illustrations of the seal and flag, and also a set of "specifications" for the flag, which defines more precise colors for the elements than does the blazon (written description) of the coat of arms:

Flag base—white.
Stars, large—dark blue; stars, small—silver gray.
Shield:

Chief—dark blue.
Stripes—white and red.

Eagle:

Wings, body, upper legs—shades of brown.
Head, neck, tail—white, detailed silver gray.
Beak, feet, lower legs—yellow.
Talons—dark gray, white highlights.

Arrows—silver gray.
Olive branch:

Leaves—shades of green; stem—brown.
Olives—green.

Rays—yellow.
Clouds—silver gray.
Scroll—silver gray.
Letters—black.

All dimensions are exclusive of heading and hems.
Device to appear on both sides of flag but will appear reversed on reverse side of flag, except that the motto shall read from left to right on both sides.

The design of the eagle is basically identical to that in the presidential flag. Other than a slightly shorter, receded central tail feather (rectrix) – which was perhaps inadvertent – all of the differences are in coloration. The written design specifies silver gray for the clouds and stars above the eagle's head, the scroll, and the arrows; these are "proper" (i.e. naturally colored), argent, white, and proper respectively in the president's seal and flag. In the flag specifications, the chief (upper third area) of the shield is dark blue (rather than the light blue specified for the presidential flag), the stem of the olive branch is brown (the presidential flag uses green), and the olives are just green (instead of specifically light green).

The background color of the flag, as on all historical versions, is white. The vice president's coat of arms does not have a ring of stars around the eagle like the president's does, but on the flag, four blue stars are added, one in the each corner.

=== Sizes ===
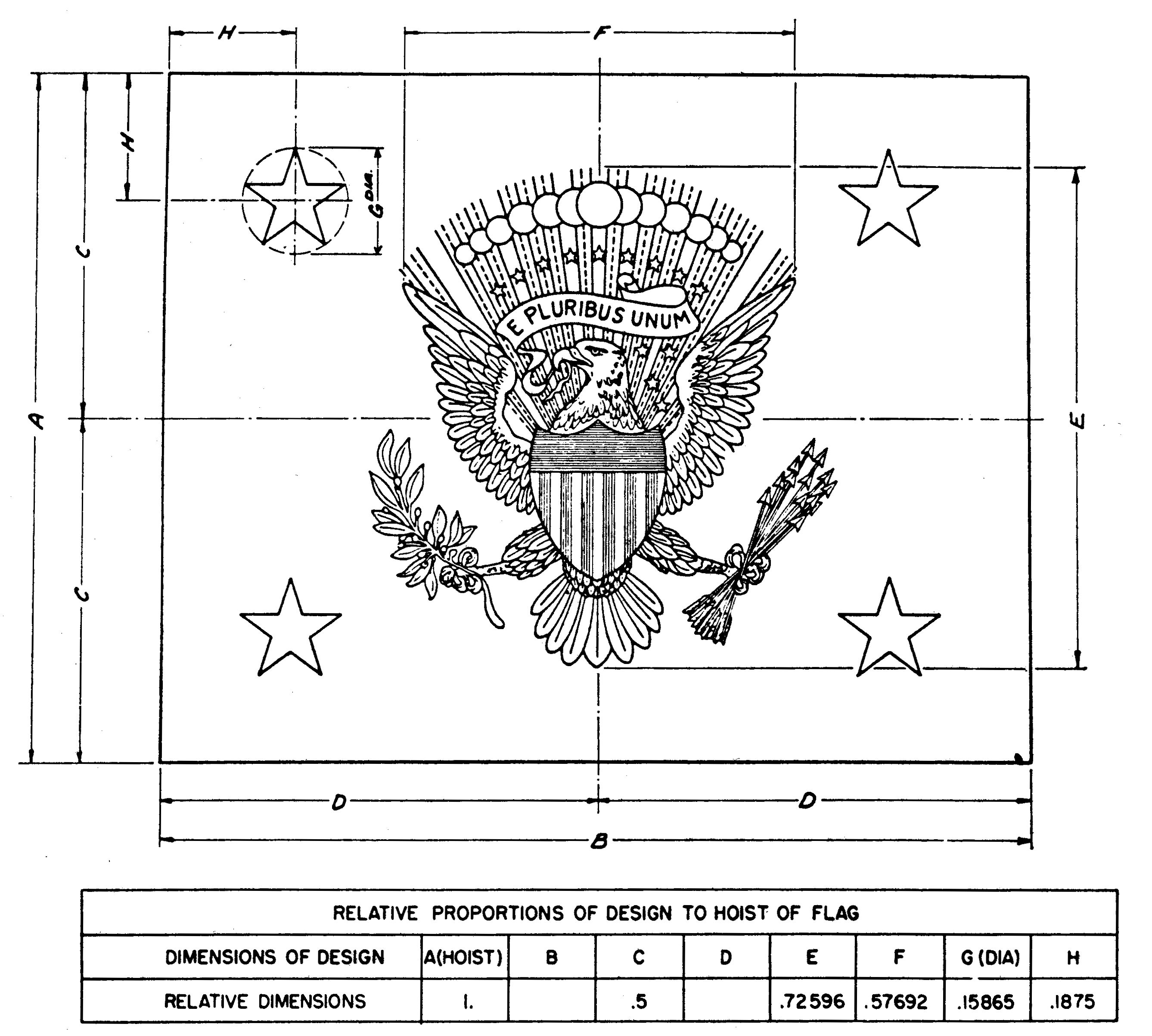
Specification of the vice president's flag from the 1975 executive order creating it.

The dimensions of all the elements in the flag are relative to the hoist (vertical size) of the flag. The relative length of the flag varies; each military service typically defines several sizes and dimensions depending on use. The coat of arms stays centered, while the four stars stay a fixed distance from the edges, so on longer flags the stars will be further apart.

A U.S. Navy ship will fly the flag while the vice president is aboard; either 3 feet 7 inches by 5 ft. 1½ in. (size 6, for ships over 600 feet long) or 1 ft. 10 in. by 2 ft. 8 in. (size 7, for ships under 600 feet). For onshore use, the dimensions are either 3 ft. 7 in. by 5 ft. 1½ in. or 1 ft. 10 in. by 2 ft. 8 in. depending on the size of the flagpole. For indoor use, a blue fringe of 2½ inches is added along with blue and white tassels. When in either small boats or automobiles, the flag is 1 ft. by 1 ft. 3 in., and on airplanes, a version 11 by 14 inches can either be printed on each side of the plane or on a detachable metal plate.

The U.S. Army also has several sizes for different uses. For indoor display the color is used; this is 4 ft. 4 in. by 5 ft. 6 in. with a 2½ in. fringe. A field flag is 6 ft. 8 in. by 12 ft. with no fringe, a boat flag is 3 by 4 ft. with no fringe, and the automobile flag is 1 ft. by 1 ft. 6 in. with a 1½ in. fringe. The Army also allows aluminum plates printed with the flag design (without fringe) to be placed on cars and aircraft; cars use a plate 6 by 9 inches, airplanes 11 by 14 inches, and helicopters 17 by 21¾ inches.

== Usage ==
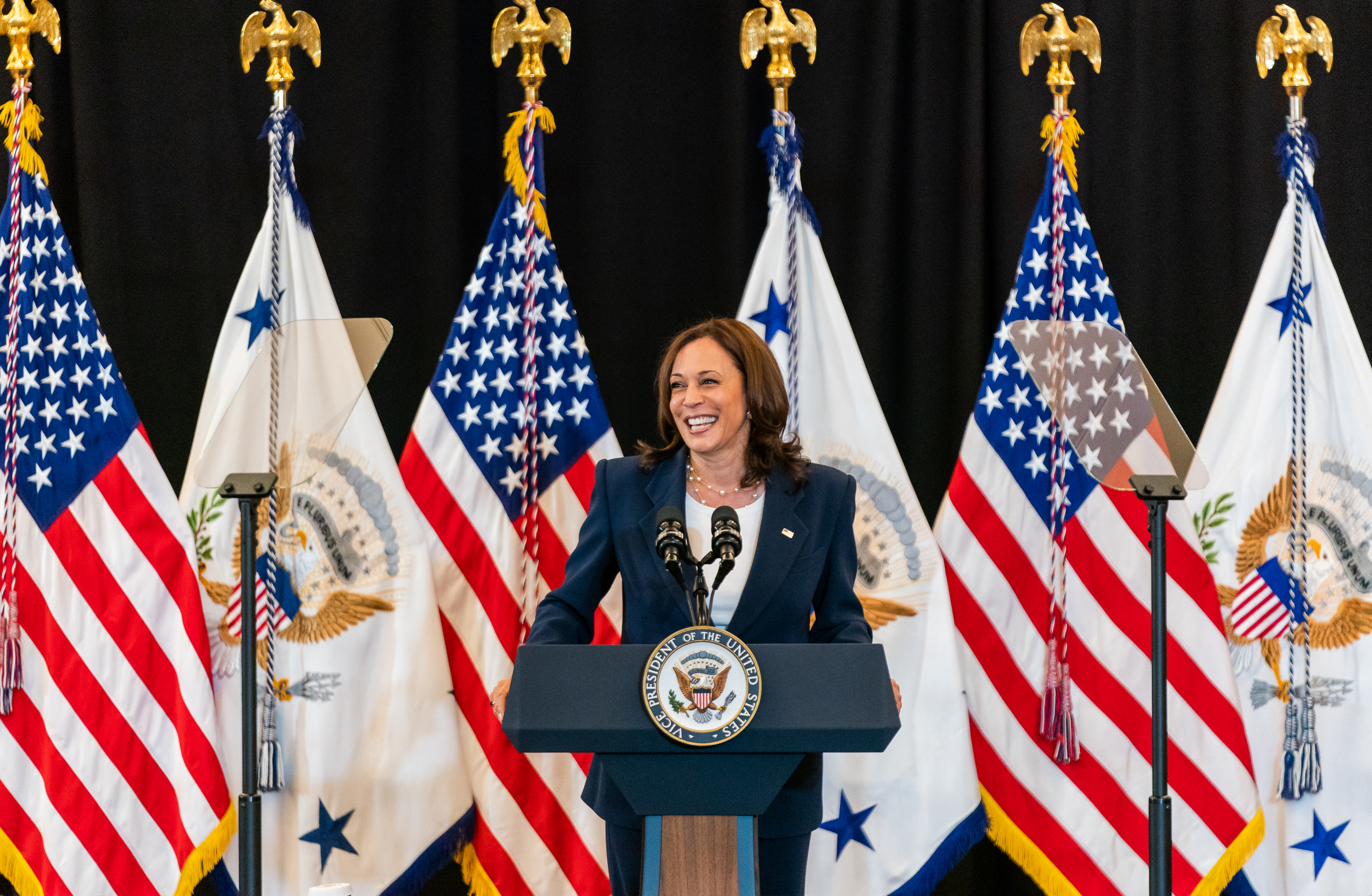
Vice President Kamala Harris giving a speech in July 2021, with the vice president's seal (on the podium) and color (in the back)

The vice president's color (with fringe, tassels, and ornamental flagstaff) is displayed in the office, usually along with the flag of the United States and sometimes others, and sometimes as a backdrop when speaking.

The flag will be flown from the after masthead of a U.S. Navy ship while the vice president is aboard, and the Navy also prescribes several other flag sizes to use in various situations when the vice president is present. Similarly, the Army prescribes use of the color (with fringe) or flag (without fringe) in different situations when the vice president is present.

== History ==
The first official flag for the vice president came in 1936, long after flags were designed for most other high government officials, though on two earlier occasions (1915 and 1919) a specially designed, unofficial flag was used for the vice president when he was representing the president at official functions. Since 1948, the flag has contained the vice presidential coat of arms, the central part of the vice presidential seal. One common thread through all the flag designs is a white background; the presidential flag has (almost) always had a blue background.

=== Early naval honors ===
In 1857, the Navy proposed honoring the president and vice president by flying the national flag at the mainmast, with the president receiving a 21-gun salute and the vice president an 18-gun version. This was not adopted, but the Naval Regulations of April 18, 1865 specified that the national flag should be flown at the mainmast during a visit from the president, and at the foremast if the vice president was aboard. Subsequent regulations switched between the national flag and union jack for the honors, but the December 31, 1869 regulations reverted to the same honors as 1865.

=== Unofficial 1915 flag ===
Flag used in 1915 and 1919

In March 1915, Vice President Thomas R. Marshall was sent to the Panama–Pacific International Exposition to represent President Wilson, which was to include a ceremony aboard a U.S. Navy ship. While most other high government officials had personal flags by this time, there was no such flag for the vice president. Therefore, Secretary of the Navy Josephus Daniels and Assistant Secretary of the Navy Franklin D. Roosevelt (who was also going, to represent Daniels) decided to create one, and chose to use a version of the president's flag (which had a depiction of the Great Seal of the United States) with a white background instead of blue. Accordingly, on March 6, a telegram was sent to the Mare Island Navy Yard, asking for two versions of this flag be made of the same dimensions as the president's flag (size #1, 10.2 by 16 feet, and size #6, 3.6 by 5.13 feet). The design was to be the same as the president's flag, except with a white field (background) instead of blue, and asked for delivery before March 20 (about when Marshall would arrive). Since the president's flag took a full month to make from scratch, this was actually very short notice, and the telegram suggested modifying existing presidential flags to save time. The flags were delivered on March 19.

The basic design was therefore a full-color version of the obverse side of the Great Seal of the United States, i.e. the eagle grasping an olive branch and thirteen arrows, with a constellation of stars surrounded by a ring of clouds over it, on a white background. The color specifications given by the Navy were:

FIELD: White
EAGLE: Brown bunting, feathers outlines in white worsted.
EAGLE'S TALONS & BEAK: Yellow bunting worked with black bunting and black worsted.
SHIELD: Red, white, and blue bunting.
HALO: White muslin stars planted on field of light blue bunting, outlined with rays of yellow worsted.
RIBBON: Yellow bunting outlined in black bunting on #1 and black worsted on #6 size.
LEAVES: Green bunting.
ARROWS: Yellow bunting outlined with black worsted.

Another contemporary description was as follows:

The flag of the Vice-President is white. The eagle is brown with feathers outlined in white. The talons and beak are yellow, worked with black worsted. The shield is blue in chief, with vertical pales white and red, below. In the halo or "glory" on this flag, the stars are white, placed on a field of light blue, outlined with rays of yellow worsted. The white ground of the flag prevents the definite dermarkation of the white cloud which should surround the "glory." This part of the crest, i. e. the halo, is outlined with yellow worsted, so that practically almost the same effect is produced as that on the President's flag.

The Secretary of the Navy's flag is blue with a white anchor and stars on it; the flag of the Assistant Secretary of the Navy uses the same design with the colors reversed (blue stars and anchor on a white background). The same concept was used for the vice president's flag, and has since become the standard system in the U.S. Government for differencing the flags of the first and second ranking civilian officials in any hierarchy, and would be repeated on all subsequent vice presidential flags.

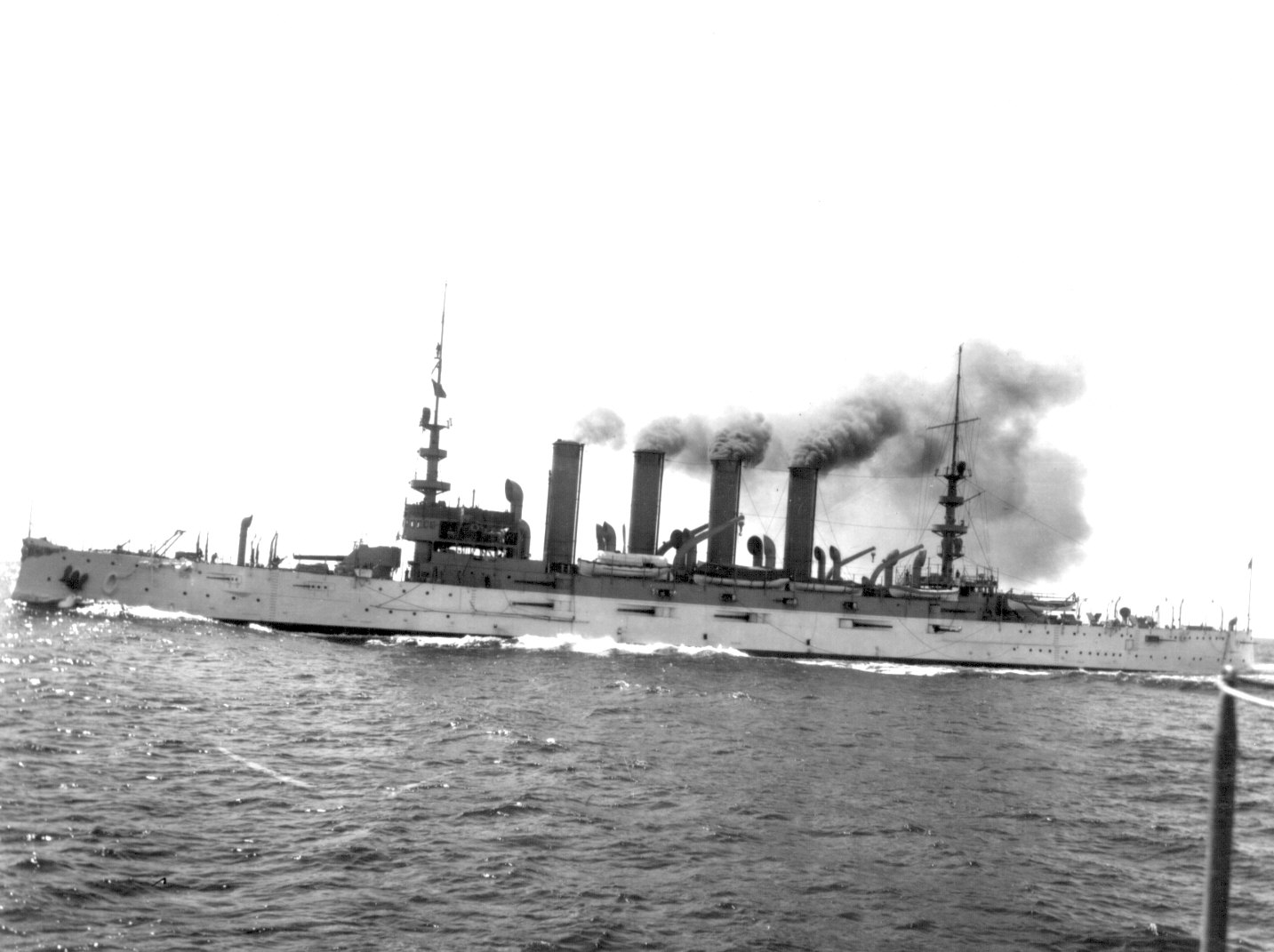
The USS Colorado, where the unofficial flag of the vice president was raised during the 1915 ceremony

Vice President Marshall arrived at the Exposition on March 20, 1915. On March 22, he attended a ceremony in San Francisco Harbor aboard the heavy cruiser USS Colorado, at the time serving as Admiral Thomas B. Howard's flagship for the Pacific Fleet. At 3:15 in the afternoon, Marshall boarded the ship, and the vice president's flag was raised at the mainmast. (In an oft-retold story, while trying to hold his cane, cigar, and top hat in his left hand so he could return a salute with his right, Marshall was unprepared for the 19-gun salute and sent all of the items flying in the air.)

The flag was used on at least one other occasion, in 1919. Due to President Wilson's recent stroke, Vice President Marshall once again needed to represent the President, hosting King Albert and Queen Elizabeth of Belgium (and their son, the Duke of Brabant) on their trip to Washington, D.C. from October 27 to 29, 1919. Part of the schedule involved a trip on the presidential yacht USS Mayflower from the Washington Navy Yard to Mount Vernon on the last day, so accordingly two flags (the same sizes as in 1915) were ordered on October 23 and delivered on October 28. The president's flag had been redesigned in the interim, but the same 1915 design for the vice president's flag was apparently used again for this occasion. The Vice President boarded first, so his flag was hoisted at the mainmast. The Belgian royalty boarded an hour later, at which point the Belgian national ensign was raised at the mainmast, with the vice president's flag being shifted to the foremast, per Navy regulations.

Originally, several reports said the 1915 design was intended to be the official flag for the vice president, but no such official order is known. Following the 1915 ceremony, Marshall asked to keep the flags, and they were given to him. A flag of this design, presumably either from 1915 or 1919, is housed at the Scottish Rite Masonic Cathedral in Fort Wayne, Indiana (Vice President Marshall's hometown).

=== 1936 flag ===
1936 vice presidential flag

In 1936, President Franklin D. Roosevelt issued Executive Order 7285, which defined an official flag of the vice president for the first time. The design was the same as the president's flag of the time, as specified in Executive Order 2390 from 1916, except with the colors reversed (much like the 1915 concept). The president's flag design was a mostly white eagle (in the presidential seal form, with the head facing to its left) on a dark blue background with four white stars in the corners. Accordingly, the vice president's flag had a mostly blue eagle with four blue stars on a white background. The shield was in color, with its blue chief over white and red stripes; the eagle's beak and talons were yellow, and the olive branch was green. The dimensions were 10.2 by 16 feet (3.1 m × 4.9 m).

The instigation for the 1936 flag appears to have been a letter from Vice President John Nance Garner to the Secretary of War George H. Dern on December 24, 1935, asking if the vice president's office had an official flag. Dern replied on January 15, 1936, that there was none, though did mention the 1915 and 1919 occasions. Dern also said the War Department thought there should be one, and would prepare drawings of possible flags and submit them for Nance's approval. At least one design was rejected, one made by Arthur E. DuBois on January 25 which depicted an eagle, columns, and the sun on a purple field. After a design was approved, Roosevelt issued Executive Order 7285 shortly thereafter on February 7, 1936.

=== 1948 flag ===
1948 vice presidential flag

In 1945, President Roosevelt started the process of changing the president's flag and seal shortly before his death, and the process was continued by President Truman later that year before officially making the change in October. During the process, it was recognized that since the vice president's flag was based on the president's, it would need to change too. Truman accordingly asked for sketches of possible designs, but since the vice presidency was vacant at the time there was no immediate need to make the change and it was delayed.

Shortly after the 1948 election, President Truman issued Executive Order 10016 to redefine the coat of arms, seal and flag of the vice president. Because the seal was to use the same design, the coat of arms was made distinctive from the president's. While still a derivative of the national coat of arms, the eagle's wings are more outstretched, with the wing tips pointing slightly down. The eagle's right talon holds a smaller olive branch, and the left talon holds a single arrow. The eagle emblem is surrounded by a ring of thirteen stars (representing the original 13 colonies). As with previous vice presidential flags, the background color was white. The executive order had an attachment which had a set of color specifications more detailed than the written definition:

Flag base—white.
Stars—blue.
Shield:

Chief—blue.
Stripes—white and red.

Eagle:

Wings, body, upper legs—shades of brown.
Head, neck, tail—white, shaded gray.
Beak, feet, lower legs—yellow.
Talons—dark gray, white high lights.
Arrow—yellow.
Olive branch:

Leaves, stem—shades of green.
Olives—light green.

Scroll—yellow with brown shadows.
Letters—black.

Device to appear on both sides of flag but will appear reversed on reverse side of flag, except that the motto shall read from left to right on both sides.

Like the current flag, the dimensions of the elements were given relative to the hoist (vertical size), and the fly (horizontal size) of the flag varied per the differing customs of the military services. The size of the color though was fixed at 4.33 by 5.5 feet (1.32 m × 1.68 m). This flag took practical effect when Alben W. Barkley was inaugurated as vice president on January 20, 1949.

=== 1975 flag ===
1975 vice presidential color (with fringe)

More than one vice president disliked the design of the eagle on the 1948 seal and flag. When Nelson Rockefeller, who was particularly critical of it, was nominated to the office under President Gerald Ford in 1974, he received permission to redesign the seal (and therefore the flag). The Army's Institute of Heraldry was asked to come up with an appropriate design. After several months of work, where about twenty models were rejected, a design was finally accepted and Ford issued Executive Order 11884 on October 29, 1975, which redefined the coat of arms, seal, and flag of the vice president.

The use of the four stars (one in each corner) is a characteristic shared by the flags used by the members of the president's Cabinet (Secretary of State, Secretary of Defense, etc.), reinforcing that the vice president is indeed a member of the Cabinet.

The written description (blazon) as well as the actual drawings were essentially identical to the presidential coat of arms, except for some differences in the colors, meaning that the eagle was now much fuller with the wing tips pointed up, holding a larger olive branch and the full complement of thirteen arrows. The ring of stars was removed, and the eagle was made larger to fill the space, so the eagle on the vice presidential flag is slightly larger than that of a presidential flag of the same size.

The 1975-introduced vice president's flag is still current and thus has not been changed since.

== See also ==
- Seal of the vice president of the United States
- Flag of the president of the United States
- Flags of governors of the U.S. states
- Great Seal of the United States
