= Flags of governors of the U.S. states =

Sixteen U.S. states have personal flags (properly called standards) for their governors, as does the commonwealth of Puerto Rico. These flags are analogous to the standards of the president and vice president of the United States. Most of their designs are based upon either the state flag or state seal/coat of arms.

== Gallery ==
Flag of the governor of Alabama

Flag of the governor of Alabama before 1939

Flag of the governor of California

Flag of the governor of Hawaii since 1959

Flag of the governor of the Territory of Hawaii

Flag of the governor of Kansas (since 1961)

Flag of the governor of Kansas (before 1961)

Flag of the governor of Massachusetts

Flag of the governor of Michigan

Flag of the governor of New York

Flag of the governor of North Dakota

Flag of the governor of Ohio

Flag of the governor of Oklahoma

Flag of the governor of Pennsylvania

Flag of the governor of Rhode Island

Flag of the governor of Tennessee

Flag of the governor of Texas

Flag of the governor of Puerto Rico

The flag of the governor of Vermont until 1923, when it was adopted as the state flag

== See also ==
- Governor (United States)
- Seals of governors of the U.S. states
- Coats of arms of the U.S. states
- Flag of the president of the United States
- Flag of the vice president of the United States
