= Flag of the president of the United States =

- Current flag of the president of the United States (since 1960).
- Use: Small vexillological symbol or pictogram in black and white showing the different uses of the flag
- Proportion: Varies with military and naval custom
- Adopted: 1945, 50-star version in 1960
- Design: Dark blue background with the presidential seal in the center
- Designed by: George Elsey, Arthur DuBois

The flag of the president of the United States consists of the presidential seal on a dark blue background. While having the same design as the presidential seal since 1945, the flag has a separate history, and the designs on the flag and seal have at different times influenced each other. The flag is often displayed near the president in official photos, or flown next to the casket of a former president in official funeral processions, and flown on the president's motorcade. The flag is not flown at half-staff since there is always an incumbent president in office. Unlike some head of state standards, the presidential flag does not fly on the White House flag pole instead of the national flag when the president is in residence; the flag of the United States continuously flies over the White House whether the president is at home or not.

== Early presidential flags ==
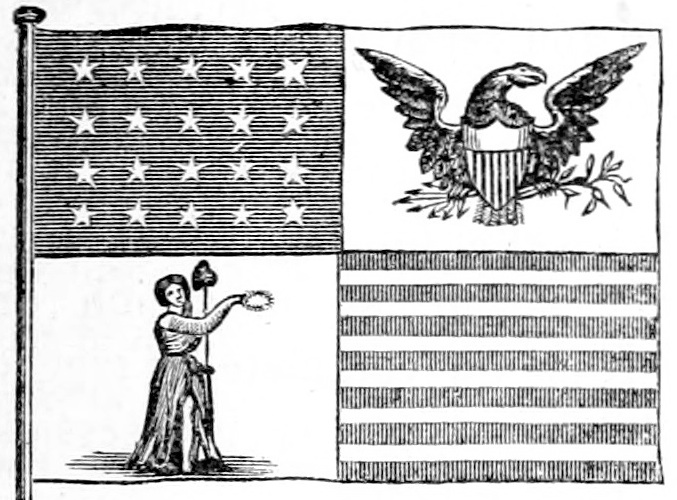
1817 proposed flag (not adopted)

During the committee discussions which eventually led to the Flag Act of 1818, an additional flag was proposed which was to indicate the president's presence at places he visited. The design divided the flag into four quarters (like the British royal standard): the upper left was the white stars on a blue background (same as the national flag); the lower left had a Goddess of Liberty on a white background; the upper right had an eagle emblem on a white background, and the lower right had the thirteen red and white stripes. This flag was not seriously considered and was not adopted. Samuel Chester Reid, who proposed this design, made a drawing of it years later which showed the eagle and Liberty in switched positions, and had the stars arranged in a larger star.

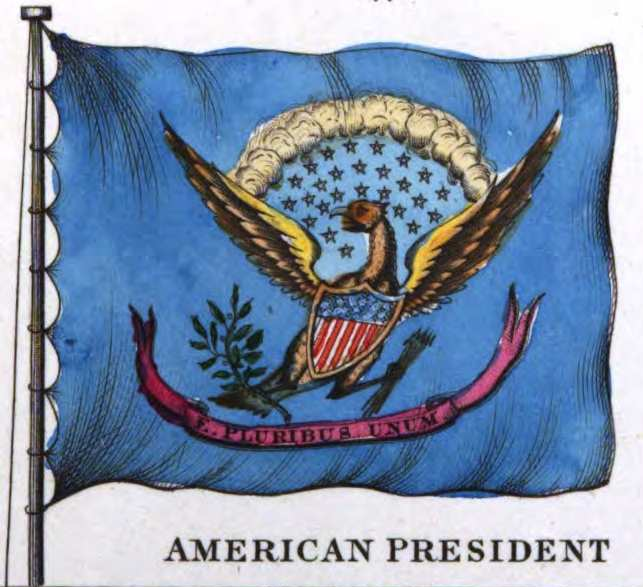
Claimed presidential flag in an 1848 book

It is possible that distinctive flags were occasionally used to represent the president on individual occasions; there are claims that a special flag was used during a trip by President Jackson to New York City in 1832, and a description of a "square, plain blue flag" used on a boat in the Brooklyn naval yard while transporting President Martin Van Buren on July 15, 1839.

An 1848 British flag book by John William Norie, and also the 1853 The Illustrated London Geography by Joseph Guy, have similar illustrations of a flag labeled as being the U.S. president's flag. Neither book reveals any further information about this flag, and such a flag is not mentioned in the Army Institute of Heraldry's detailed page on presidential flags nor other books on the flag's history. The design is simply a version of the national coat of arms (i.e. the obverse of the Great Seal), which was a common motif for flags representing heads of state and also the same basic concept used in the later presidential flag of the Navy. Both depictions also use an arc of clouds for the crest, a style which was later (and still is) used on the presidential seal. The 1848 book shows a 26-star U.S. flag, which was in use from 1837 to 1845 (the depicted presidential flag also has 26 stars).

The 37-star Union flag, used by the Navy from 1867 to 1869 during presidential visits

As the president is Commander-in-Chief of the Army and Navy, each service developed its own tradition of honoring the president, which eventually led each to design their own presidential flag. This did not happen until the late 19th century however, and the Navy at first used existing flags for their ceremonies.

The first record in regulations to prescribe a flag for the president was the 1858 Signals for the Use of the United States Navy, which specified that the union jack (the canton of the national flag by itself, i.e. blue with white stars for all the states) should be flown at the mainmast to signify the presence of the commander-in-chief. In 1863, this was changed to use the national flag instead, but in 1864 was reverted so that once again the jack was used. The Naval Regulations of April 18, 1865, switched back to use the national flag, specifying it should be flown both from the mainmast while the president is aboard a ship, and also on the bow of boats on which he embarks. The 1866 Naval Signal Code (possibly not in effect until 1867) changed back to use the union flag, and on December 31, 1869, the change was reverted yet again, with the national ensign being flown on a ship while the president was aboard. This practice continued until 1882.

== 1882 Navy flag ==
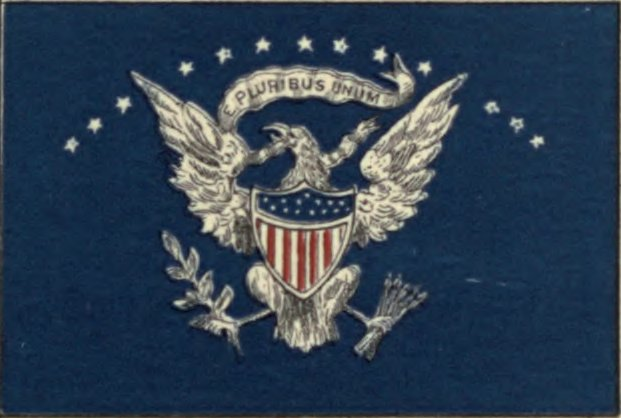
Navy presidential flags; the original 1882 version (top) and after the design was updated to match the official Great Seal (below).

In the spring of 1882, Chester Arthur noted that the heads of state of many other countries had their own flag, but the president of the United States did not. His cabinet agreed, and Arthur himself apparently decided on the final design. On August 9, 1882, the Navy issued the order: "The flag of the President of the United States shall consist of a blue ground with arms of the United States in the center, and shall be of the dimensions prescribed for the admiral's flag [10.2 by 14.4 feet (3.1 m × 4.4 m)]. The flag shall be hoisted at the main of vessels of war while the President is on board, and shall be carried in the bow of his boat."

An illustration of the flag was published in the 1882 Flags of Maritime Nations, a Navy publication. As this was before the 1885 redesign of the Great Seal, this flag showed an eagle with bent legs, somewhat like the Great Seal design at the time. The crest of the coat of arms was omitted however, and instead an arc of thirteen stars was used, above the eagle and on either side of the wings. The eagle, arrows, and olive branch were all in white.

The flag was first used by Arthur on a trip to Florida in 1883. It was used primarily aboard boats, such as on the presidential yacht USS Dolphin in 1893 for a naval fleet review during celebrations related to the 400th anniversary of Columbus. There were some exceptions though, such as during the centennial of Washington's inauguration in 1889, and by a hotel proprietor during a presidential trip to New York City in 1897.

At some point before the turn of the century (possibly in 1897; the 1899 Flags of Maritime Nations showed the new version), the design on the flag was changed to match the Tiffany design of the Great Seal and be in full color. The text of the naval orders did not change, as this was a change in the coat of arms itself. This design was used by the Navy until 1916.

== 1898 Army flag ==
1898 Army presidential flag

In early 1898, in the lead up to the Spanish–American War and following its first flag for an individual (the Secretary of War) in 1897, it was noted that the Army did not have its own flag for the President, the Commander-in-Chief. The Navy flag was too similar to the Army infantry flag (which was also primarily the Great Seal on a blue background), so a different design was needed.

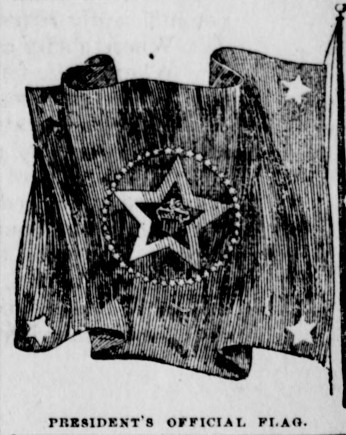
Blue variant

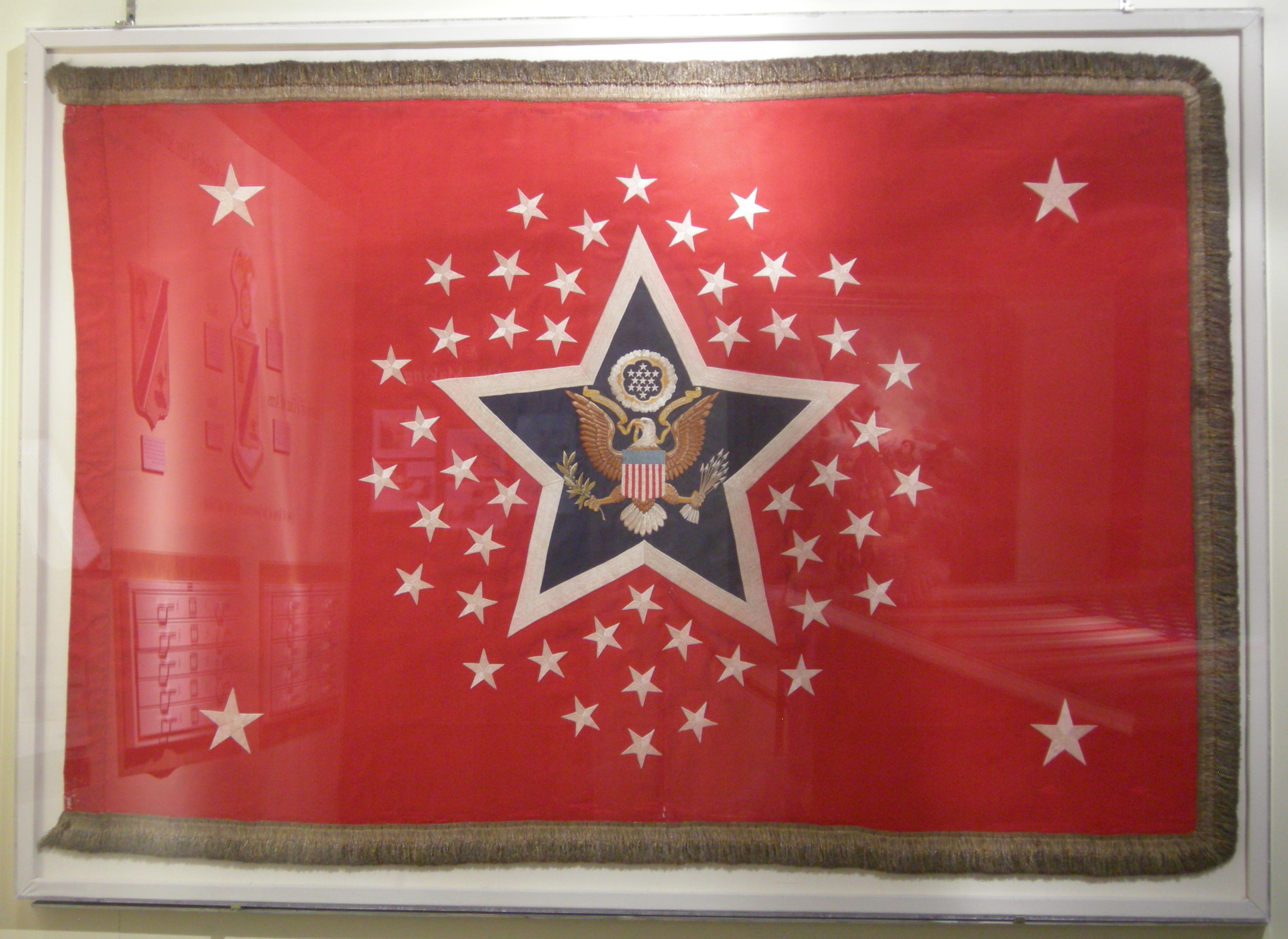
A 46-star color on display at the Army Quartermaster Museum

Frederick D. Owen, an engineer working in the War Department, came up with a flag which met the approval of Secretary of War Alger and President McKinley. Owen's flag was officially adopted by General Orders No. 13 on March 28, 1898. The order specified both a presidential flag, and a presidential color of the same design. The color was more meant for ceremonial purposes, was smaller than the flag, made of silk, and had a gold and silver fringed border. The dimensions of the flag were 8 by 13 feet (2.4 m × 4.0 m), and the dimensions of the color were 4 by 6.5 feet (1.2 m × 2.0 m).

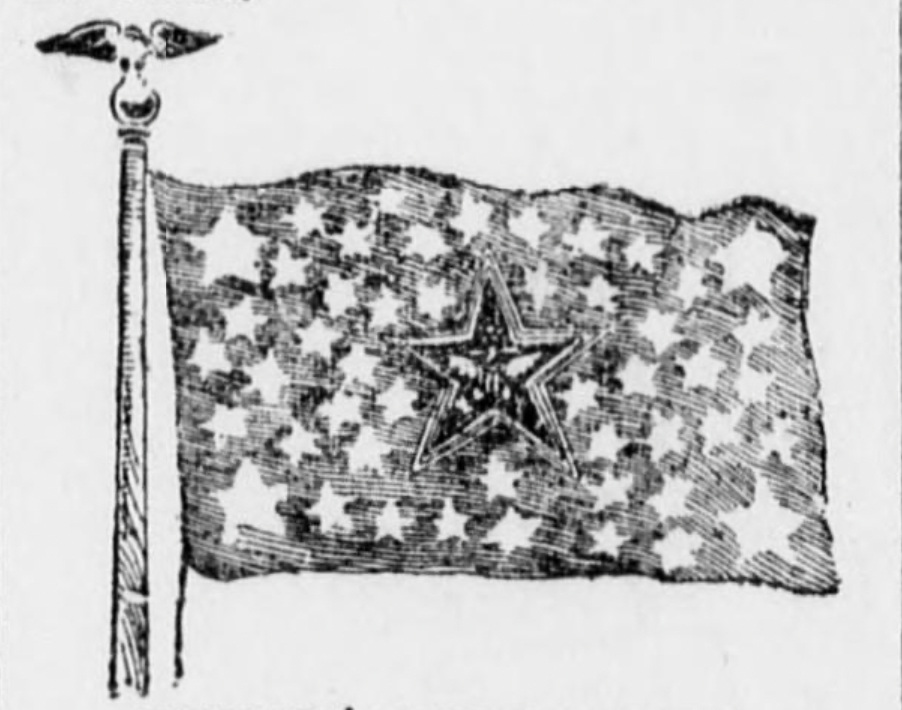
Variant with the stars covering the whole field

The flag was scarlet, with a large blue star in the middle outlined in white which contained the Great Seal. There were four white stars, one in each corner, and scattered between the angles of the large central star were 45 small white stars, representing the 45 states. This flag was placed in the cabinet room in the White House during the war, and was first shown in public during peace jubilee celebrations in Chicago and Philadelphia in October, 1898.

In 1908, following the admission of Oklahoma as a state, a 46th star was added at the bottom. One of these flags was given to Theodore Roosevelt as a gift, and one hangs today in Roosevelt's home at Sagamore Hill.

== 1902 flag ==
1902 presidential flag

In March 1901, the German naval attaché in Washington inquired as to the proper use of the flags when rendering honors abroad, as having two flags to represent a head of state was a unique situation. After discussions, and perhaps influenced by Secretary of State John Hay who noted that the Navy flag had come first and claimed that McKinley had never approved the Army version, President Roosevelt decided that there should only be one official flag for the president and chose the Navy's version. On November 12, 1901, Roosevelt's secretary sent out a letter with the decision, saying it was primarily because the Navy flag was older. While the Army later updated its regulations to use the Navy design for its flag, they retained their own definition of the presidential color, so its design lived on and was still used in many situations.

Subsequently, a third flag was designed and introduced in May 1902. This flag also showed the Great Seal on a blue background, like the Navy flag, but the eagle, scroll, and arrows were depicted in pure white outlined in black. The crest above the eagle's head was also different; instead of a ring of clouds the constellation of stars was only surrounded by a circular set of rays. This flag was supposedly to be used in times of peace only, with the original two flags still being used by their respective services in times of war. Several photos show this design was in fact used, such as at a Columbus Day celebration in 1912, on the presidential yacht Mayflower during a naval review in New York Harbor on October 14, 1912, and in a 1914 magazine article about the flag-making operation at the New York Navy Yard, where the flag is described as taking a full month to make (the longest of any of their flags). However, the Navy flag with the full-color eagle was also used during this period, as seen in photographs during the July 1911 groundbreaking for the Panama–California Exposition.

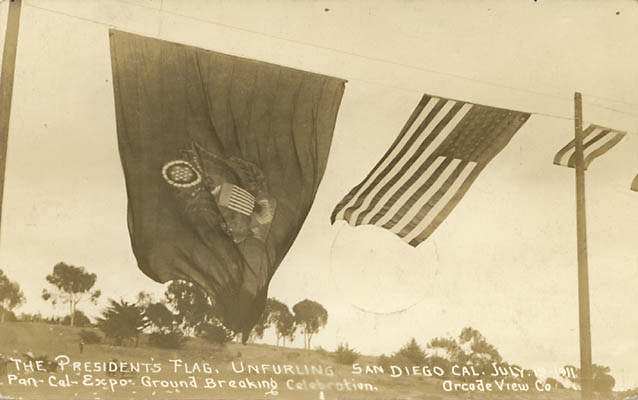
The full-color Navy version as used in 1911

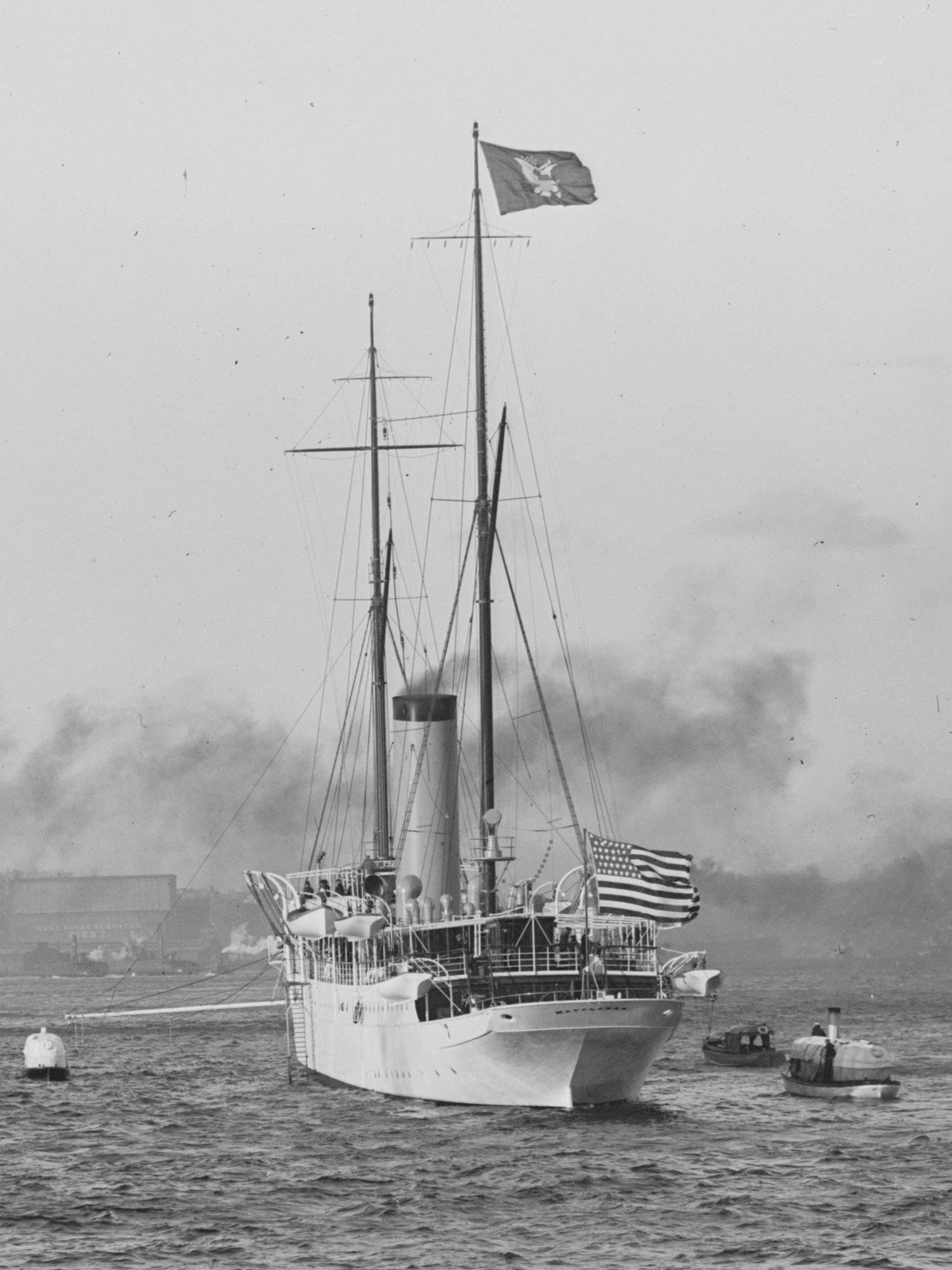
The third, 1902 flag flying on the USS Mayflower in 1912

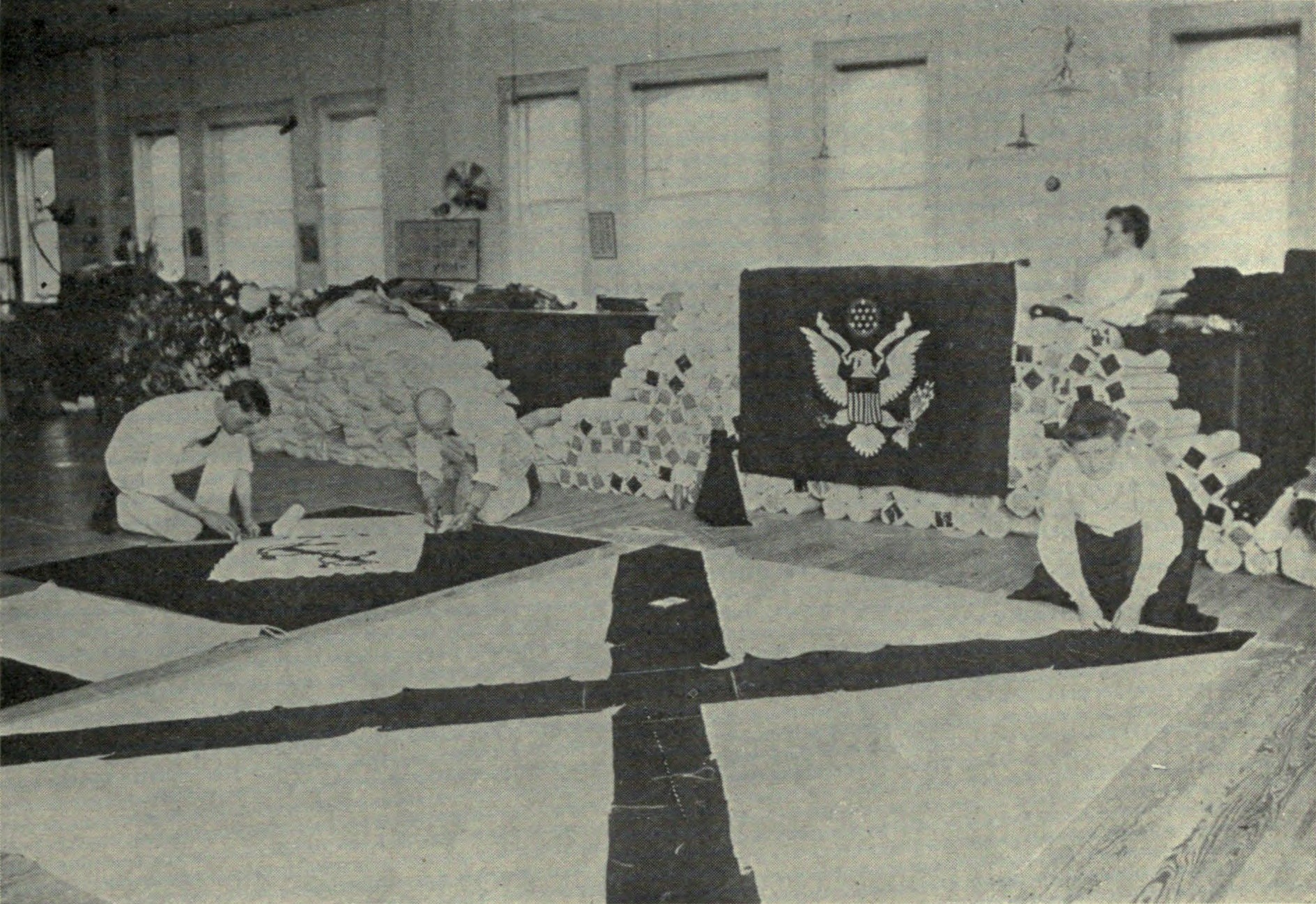
A 1902-type flag being made in 1914

== 1912 Army color ==
1912 Army presidential color

In 1912, President Taft appointed a Flag Board to discuss aspects of the upcoming 48-star flag. As part of their recommendations, they noted that there were two official flags used for the president, though incorrectly stating the designs were identical except for the background color (red for the Army flag and blue for the Navy), and recommended that a single presidential flag be adopted. Taft subsequently issued Executive Order 1556 on June 24, 1912, and an updated Executive Order 1637 on October 29, which defined the precise dimensions of the 48-star flag. Both orders additionally state that "the color of the field of the President's Flag shall be blue". This left the Navy flag unchanged, but did force a change in the Army version, and so on February 20, 1913, an order was duly issued which switched the background of the Army presidential color to blue and the color of the star in the middle to scarlet. A 46th star had previously been added to the Army color in 1908, and the blue version was also updated to have 48 stars.

== 1916 flag ==
1916 presidential flag

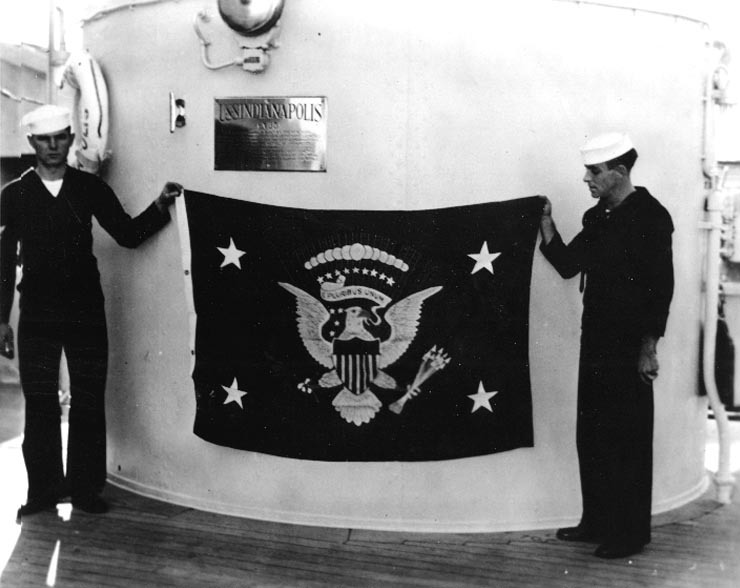
The flag being displayed in 1936 by the crew of the USS Indianapolis (CA-35). The USS Indianapolis served as President Franklin D. Roosevelt's ship of state

On September 29, 1915, President Wilson watched a march by the Grand Army of the Republic where the reviewing stand displayed both the presidential flag and the Army's presidential color. Afterwards, this led to discussions on the situation which (among others) included Assistant Secretary of the Navy Franklin D. Roosevelt and the Aide to the Secretary of the Navy Byron McCandless. According to McCandless, when asked for suggestions on a design for a single presidential flag, he suggested adding four white stars in the corners of the Navy flag, which would differentiate the flag enough from the infantry colors to make it acceptable for use by the Army. Wilson liked the idea, but wanted the president's eagle (from the presidential seal, which faced to its left) on the flag instead of the Great Seal. To demonstrate this, Wilson showed McCandless the Martiny plaque of the presidential seal then in the floor of the Entrance Hall of the White House, and also a full-color print of the seal he had likely obtained from the Philadelphia firm of Bailey Banks & Biddle. This print was used as the basis for the official drawings of the new flag.

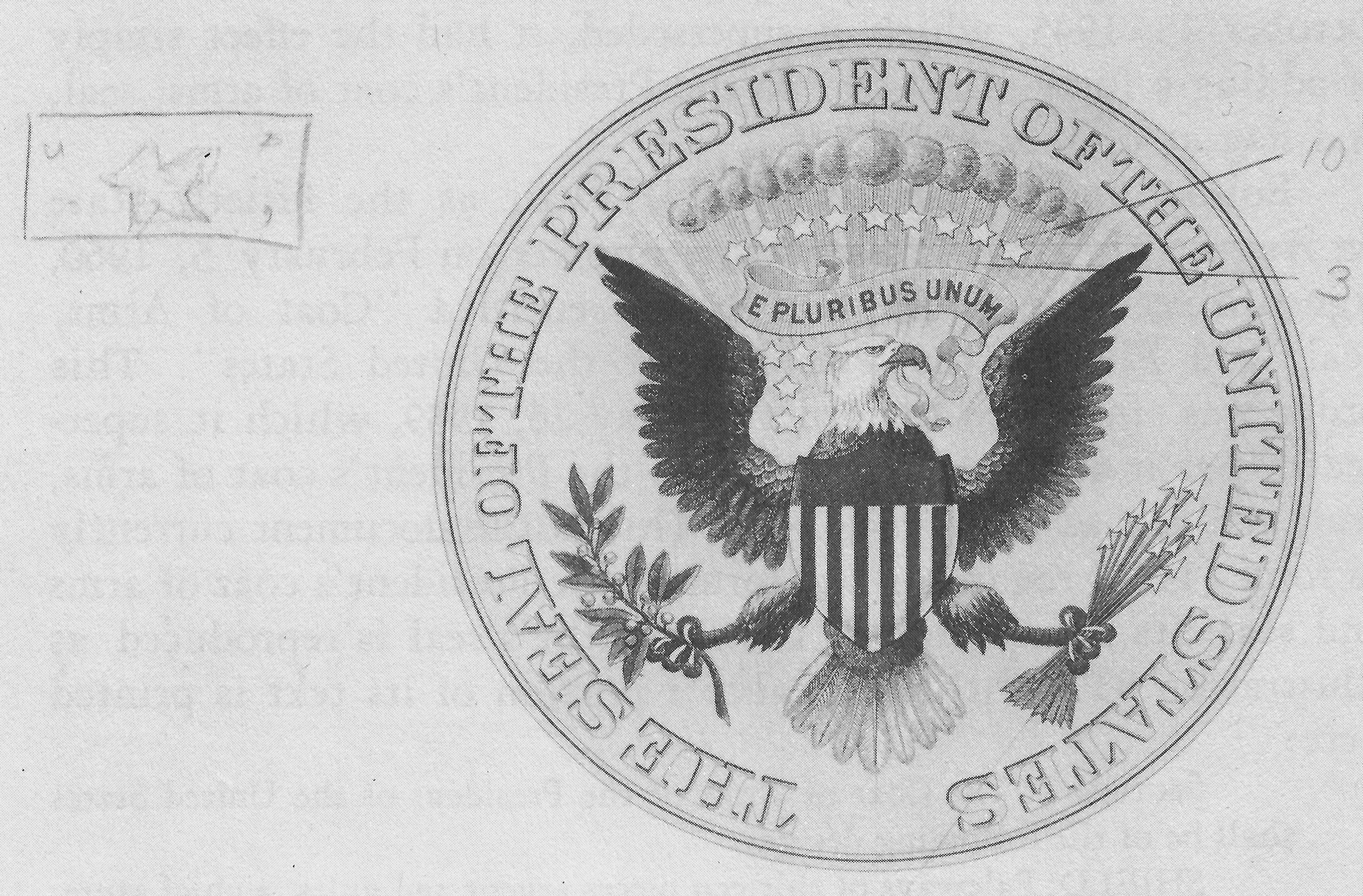
The Bailey Banks & Biddle print used

On May 29, 1916, President Wilson issued Executive Order 2390, which officially changed to the new design. The eagle was almost entirely white with black stitching, except for the beak, legs and feet which were in yellow. The arrows were also white, though the olive branch was in color (green leaves and light green olives). There were thirteen clearly defined white cloud puffs in an arc, with the rays of the glory in gold. There were four large stars, one in each corner. The dimensions were 10.2 by 16 feet (3.1 m × 4.9 m).

The next revisions of the Navy and Army regulations changed their definitions of the flag (and in the Army's case, the color as well) to conform to the new design, meaning there finally was just one presidential flag, and it was used until 1945.

== Current flag ==
1945 flag, with 48 stars

The flag was changed by President Truman in 1945, a process which began with inquiries by President Franklin Roosevelt (who had been involved with the creation of the 1916 flag) shortly before his death. The new flag used the same basic design for the eagle, except (in response to some heraldic criticisms) changed the eagle to face towards its right (dexter, the direction of honor) and thus towards the olive branch, and the eagle was changed to be in full color. Instead of the four stars, a circular ring of 48 stars was added around the eagle.

Truman issued Executive Order 9646 on October 25, 1945, which unified the coat of arms, flag, and seal to use the new design. The flag was first flown at the commissioning of the USS Franklin D. Roosevelt (CV-42) two days later. The only changes have been to add more stars for new states; President Eisenhower issued Executive Order 10823 on May 26, 1959 (effective July 4) to add a star for Alaska, and later issued Executive Order 10860 on February 5, 1960 (again effective the following July 4) to add a 50th star for Hawaii. The design has not changed since.

The current flag is defined in Executive Order 10860:

The Color and Flag of the President of the United States shall consist of a dark blue rectangular background of sizes and proportions to conform to military and naval custom, on which shall appear the Coat of Arms of the President in proper colors. The proportions of the elements of the Coat of Arms shall be in direct relation to the hoist, and the fly shall vary according to the customs of the military and naval services.

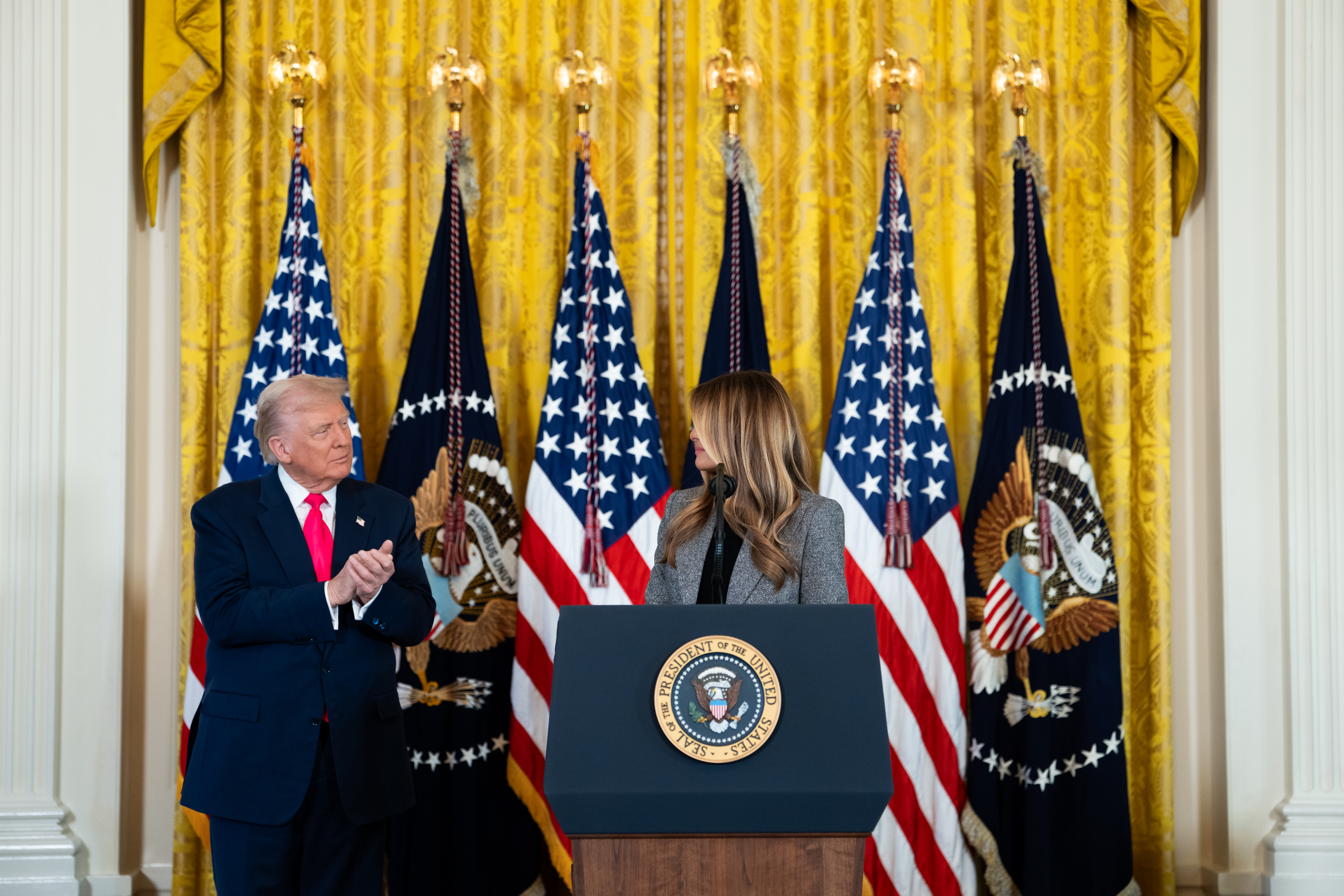
The presidential flags as decorated in the East Room, late 2025.

Attached to the order were illustrations of the seal and flag, and also a set of "specifications" for the flag, which defines more precise colors for the elements than does the blazon of the coat of arms:

Flag base—blue.

Stars, large and small—white.
Shield:

Chief—light blue.
Stripes—white and red.

Eagle:

Wings, body, upper legs—shades of brown.
Head, neck, tail—white, shaded gray.
Beak, feet, lower legs—yellow.
Talons—dark gray, white highlights.

Arrows—white, shaded gray.
Olive branch:

Leaves, stem—shades of green.
Olives—light green.

Rays—yellow.
Clouds—white, shaded gray.
Scroll—white with gray shadows.
Letters—black.

All dimensions are exclusive of heading and hems. Device to appear on both sides of flag but will appear reversed on reverse side of flag, except that the motto shall read from left to right on both sides.

== Reproduction ==
It is illegal to reproduce or sell the flag of the president pursuant to Title 18 of the United States Code § 713(b), because it substantially reproduces the seal of the president.

== Gallery ==
Edward C. Kuhn, a designer of many early U.S. Army insignia and coats of arms, made a series of watercolors of older presidential flags.

1882 Flag (Navy)

1898 Color (Army)

1902 Flag (Navy)

1902 Flag

1912 Color (Army)

1916 Flag

== See also ==
- Flag of the vice president of the United States
- Flags of governors of the U.S. states
- Great Seal of the United States
- Seal of the president of the United States
