= Armorial of presidents =

This is a disambiguation page.

Armorial of presidents may refer to:

== Lists ==
- List of personal coats of arms of presidents of the United States
- List of personal coats of arms of vice presidents of the United States
