= United States heraldry =

The coat of arms as it appears on the Great Seal of the United States, agency emblems, passports and embassies.

The escutcheon also appears by itself on (for example) the seal of the United States Coast Guard.

Heraldry in the United States was first established by British and other European settlers who brought with them the heraldic customs of English heraldry or their respective countries of origin. Due to the association of coat of arms with aristocracy and elitism there has been continuous debate since America's founding whether heraldry is reconcilable with republican values of equality. Several early colonial Americans and founding fathers employed personal arms.

== Usage ==
Most states do not employ coats of arms, choosing to use seals as their official emblems, but the United States has a coat of arms. Many private individuals have assumed arms, in addition to those who inherited them, or had them granted by or registered in another country.

=== States and Territories ===
Eighteen states have officially adopted a coat of arms. The former independent Republic of Texas and Kingdom of Hawaii each had a separate national coat of arms, which are no longer used. Puerto Rico has a coat of arms as well, originally granted by the Spanish Crown in 1512, which also influenced the design of that territory's seal.

The flag of Maryland and the flag of the District of Columbia are banner of arms.

=== Tribal ===
The official symbols of many Native American tribes draw on motifs from their art and mythology.

The seal and flag of the Navajo nation feature four sacred mountains of the Navajo in their respective ceremonial colors, with the tricolor rainbow representing the tribes' sovereignty. The 50 arrowheads around the seal represent the protective duty of the 50 states towards the Navajo.

The Flag of the Haudenosaunee Confederacy looks like the Hiawatha Belt that symbolizes the peace between the first five Haudenosaunee tribes. The color purple is sacred to many tribes that historically have used Wampum.

Formline inspired logos are used by Tribal governments of the pacific northwest

=== Personal ===
For a fee, the English College of Arms and the Scottish Court of the Lord Lyon will devise achievements for persons descendant of their jurisdiction. The Chief Herald of Ireland has granted arms to Americans of Irish descent. Some American recipients of foreign orders of knighthood in which arms are expected to be borne have received arms from the relevant foreign authorities.

There are several private organizations working to advance heraldic traditions in the United States such as the American Heraldry Society and the American College of Heraldry. The American College of Heraldry registers of arms and give advice on designing coats of arms, while the American Heraldry Society promotes academic scholarship on American heraldry.

== Debate and Legality ==
The Title of Nobility Clause prohibits federal and state governments from conferring titles of nobility and there are few noble coats of arms in the country.

The proposed Titles of Nobility Amendment was proposed by the 11th congress but never ratified. It would have stripped citizenship from those who accept, hold or inherit noble title. How this amendment would conflict with the preexisting clause or with the first amendments freedoms of speech and association remains unclear. No state has ratified the amendment since 1812. Like many older amendments it has no ratification deadline.

Private persons, however, including several past presidents, have employed coats of arms either granted to them, or which they inherited. There is no official regulation on arms, except for the official seals, badges, insignia, decorations and medals of the country and the states.

There was one anomalous exception to this lack of regulation: the coat of arms of the Swiss Confederation was specifically protected from unauthorized use within the U.S., under penalty of a fine and/or imprisonment for up to six months. This prohibition was repealed by the "Clean Up the Code Act of 2019."

== U.S. Army Institute of Heraldry ==
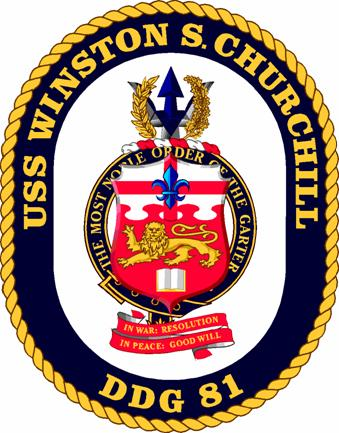
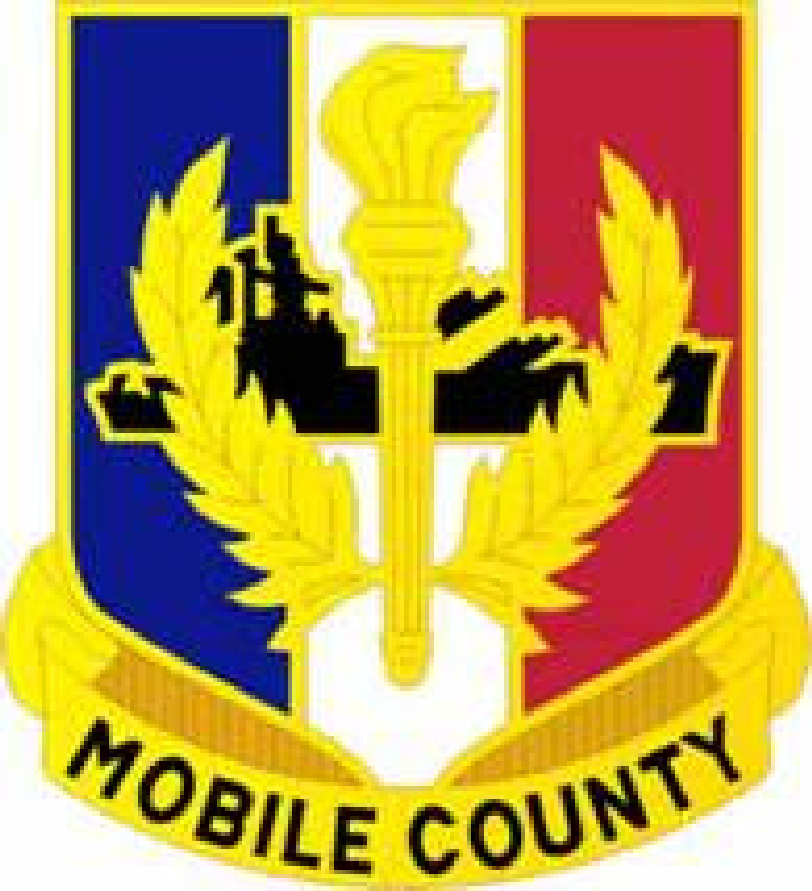
Three examples of work by the institute: the seal of the president of the United States; the coat of arms of the USS Winston S. Churchill; Mobile County Public School JROTC Distinctive Unit Insignia

Heraldic and other military symbols have been used by the military forces as well as other organizational elements of the government since the beginning of the Revolution. However, until 1919, there was no coordinated, overall military symbolism program. In that year, within the War Department General Staff, an office was delegated the responsibility for the coordination and approval of coats of arms and insignia of certain Army organizations. In 1924, formal staff responsibility for specific military designs was delegated to The Quartermaster General. As the needs for symbolism by the military services and the national government expanded, the scope of the services furnished by The Quartermaster General's Office evolved into a sizable heraldic program. The acceleration of activities brought about by World War II, the expansion of the Army, and subsequent increase of interest in symbolism, contributed to the growth of the program. In 1949, the Munitions Board, acting for the Army, Navy and Air Force, directed the Army to provide heraldic services to all military departments. The program was expanded further as a result of the enactment of Public Law 85-263, approved September 1957, 71 Stat. 589, which delineates the authority of the Secretary of the Army to furnish heraldic services to the military departments and other branches of the federal government.

The Institute of Heraldry was established in 1960 at Cameron Station in Alexandria, Virginia. Within the institute, functions formerly performed within the Office of The Quartermaster General and several field activities were consolidated. Upon reorganization of the Army in 1962, responsibility for the Heraldic Program was assigned to The Adjutant General's Office. In 1987, with the realignment of certain Army Staff agency functions, the institute was transferred to the United States Army Human Resources Command. In April 1994, The Institute of Heraldry was relocated from Cameron Station to Fort Belvoir, Virginia. As a result of a realignment in October 2004, responsibility for the Heraldic Program was assigned to The Administrative Assistant to the Secretary of the Army, Resources and Programs Agency.

The U.S. Army Institute of Heraldry consists of a staff of twenty civilians. The mission of the institute is to furnish heraldic services to the Armed Forces and other United States government organizations, including the Executive Office of the President. The activities of the Institute encompass research, design, development, standardization, quality control, and other services relating to official symbolic items—seals, decorations, medals, insignia, badges, flags, and other items awarded to or authorized for official wear or display by government personnel and agencies. Limited research and information services concerning official symbolic items are also provided to the general public.

== Cattle brands ==
Due to the historic prevalence of open range ranching and cattle rustling in the American west, the branding of livestock with simple, unalterable and easily differentiable marks to prove prima facie ownership became necessary.

Because scars morph when healing, and in order to be forged or welded out of simple strips of metal, cattle brands are often made up of multiple simple lines, curves, letters and numbers. Alteration of brands by thieves is also a major consideration when designing a brand.

States heavily regulate brands, requiring them to be registered and recorded in Brand Books, analogous to a roll of arms. Multiple ranchers are occasionally allowed to use the same brand, provided they are placed on different parts of the animal. Cattle brands thus represent some of the only non-governmental heraldry regulated by law in the United States.

Due to their prevalence in the cattle industry, many settlements with current or historic ties to ranching have used local brands in art.

Some uses of brands outside the simple identification of cattle:

- The entrance to the Panhandle–Plains Historical Museum is tiled with famous Texas brands.
- Two Colt Single Action Army revolvers belonging to Manuel T. Gonzaullas and in the possession of The Autry Museum of the American West are engraved with cattle brands.
- The publicly traded Tejon Ranch uses a stylized cross on a hill as a trademark.
- The fictional Yellowstone ranch uses a rocking Y as a brand and trademark for the show.

They are comparable in origin to Tamga.

== Timeline ==
=== 16th century ===
- The English settlement of Ralegh, in Virginia, applies for a grant of civic arms from the College of Arms in 1586 – it is uncertain if the grant was made.

=== 17th century ===
Arms of Lord Baltimore, and later those of Maryland.

- The Virginia Company of London was chartered and granted official arms in 1606 for the purpose of establishing the colony of Virginia at Jamestown – the company's arms became Virginia's government coat of arms for the duration of the colonial period
- The Dutch New Netherland Company establishes the New Netherland (Nieuw Nederland) settlement in 1614 – it assumes official arms in 1630.
- Lord Baltimore assigns his personal arms to the Maryland colony in 1634, which remain in use to this day.
- Harvard College in Massachusetts assumes arms in 1643.
- Rhode Island assumes official arms in 1661.
- New York (city) assumes civic arms in 1686.
- The first English grant of arms to an American colonist: Francis Nicholson, of Maryland, in 1694.
- The College of William and Mary in Virginia, as the sole royal foundation in the American colonies, is granted arms in 1694.

=== 18th century ===
Arms of Benjamin Franklin

- Queen Anne establishes a Carolina Herald, and a local aristocracy of landgraves and cassiques, for the Carolina colony in 1705 – Lawrence Crump (at the College of Arms) is Carolina Herald but does not appear to have granted any arms.
- Connecticut assumes official arms in 1711.
- St. Augustine, Florida petitions Philip V, King of Spain, to grant the city a coat of arms in 1715. Although granted, there is no record the city received its arms until 1991.
- The first Scottish grant of arms to an American colonist: Rhode Island governor Samuel Cranston, in 1724.
- Yale College in Connecticut assumes arms in 1736.
- Princeton University in New Jersey assumes arms in 1746.
- The Gore Roll is the earliest collection of American heraldry organized into a roll of arms, c. 1750s.
- The thirteen British colonies declare independence, as the United States of America, in 1776 – at least 35 of the signatories of the Declaration of Independence, including John Hancock and Benjamin Franklin, are armigerous.
- Five states assume official arms during or shortly after the War of Independence: New Jersey and Pennsylvania in 1776, Delaware and New York in 1777, and Massachusetts in 1780.
- The United States Congress assumes official arms in 1782.
- President George Washington states in 1788 that heraldry is not "unfriendly to the purest spirit of republicanism".
- The United States Department of the Treasury assumes official arms c. 1789.
- President Thomas Jefferson bears a coat of arms.

=== 19th century ===
Arms of Wisconsin, assumed c. 1848.

- President John Adams bears a coat of arms.
- Maine assumes state arms in 1820; Vermont in 1821; Missouri in 1822; and Michigan in 1836.
- The Mexican province of Texas, which has a large American settler population, becomes a republic in 1836 – it later assumes official arms depicting a 'Lone Star'.
- Wisconsin assumes state arms c. 1848.
- Colt adopts a rampant horse with a broken spear in its mouth as a symbol, from the ancestral arms of founder Samuel Colt c. 1855.
- The Committee on Heraldry of the New England Historic Genealogical Society is established in 1864.
- Philadelphia assumes civic arms in 1874.
- Colorado assumes state arms in 1877.
- President James A. Garfield bears arms.
- President Chester A. Arthur bears arms.
- Publications include Edgar de V. Vermont's America Heraldica in 1886, and Eugene Zieber's Heraldry in America in 1895.
- Idaho assumes state arms in 1891.
- The U.S. annexes the Pacific island state of Hawaii in 1898 – it retains its existing official arms, dating from c1845.
- The U.S. takes over the former Spanish colony of Puerto Rico in 1898 – it already has official arms, dating from 1511.
- The Army assigns arms to the United States Military Academy at West Point in 1898.

=== 20th century ===
John F. Kennedy's arms granted by the Chief Herald of Ireland in 1961.

- The United States Army Institute of Heraldry, established in 1919, is the only official heraldic authority of the United States government
- President Theodore Roosevelt bears ancestral Dutch arms – they are also borne by President Franklin Delano Roosevelt.
- Publications include William A. Crozier's Crozier's General Armory in 1904 and John Matthews' A Complete American Armory in 1905.
- Los Angeles assumes civic arms in 1905.
- San Diego assumes civic arms in 1914.
- The U.S. Army establishes a heraldry office and a system of unit coats of arms in 1919.
- An early example of an English grant of honorary arms to a US citizen descended from a pre-1783 colonist: Alain C. White, in 1920.
- The 51st Artillery Regiment is the first army unit to adopt a coat of arms, in 1922.
- President Calvin Coolidge has a coat of arms.
- Publications include Charles K. Bolton's Bolton's American Armory in 1927; the first volume of the New England Historic Genealogical Society's A Roll of Arms in 1928; and Eugene Spofford's Armorial Families of America in 1939.
- Rhode Island has civic arms devised for all its towns in the 1920s.
- Alabama assumes state arms in 1939.
- The Federal Bureau of Investigation assumes arms in 1940.
- The US Army Air Force establishes a system of unit emblems and coats of arms in 1945 – when it becomes the US Air Force in 1947, President Truman assigns it official arms.
- Columbia University in New York assumes arms in 1949.
- President Truman assigns official arms to the Central Intelligence Agency in 1950.
- Film star Douglas Fairbanks Junior obtains an English grant of arms in 1951.
- President Dwight D. Eisenhower assumes arms in 1955.
- North Dakota assumes state arms in 1957.
- The Army's heraldry section is reorganised as The Institute of Heraldry in 1960.
- The Irish government presents President John F. Kennedy with a coat of arms 1961.
- A private American College of Heraldry & Arms is established in 1966 – it closes in 1970.
- The ACH&A devises arms for Presidents Lyndon B. Johnson in 1968, and Richard M. Nixon in 1970.
- A new, private, American College of Heraldry is established in 1972.
- John Brooke-Little, Richmond Herald, presents a coat of arms to Hampden-Sydney College on October 19, 1976.
- Virginia assumes state arms devised by the English College of Arms in 1976.
- President Ronald W. Reagan bears assumed arms, registered in Spain and Switzerland in 1980.
- The College of Arms Foundation is established in 1984, to make donations to the College of Arms in England.
- The Mescalero Apache Tribe obtains a devisal of arms from the English College of Arms in 1986.
- The Irish government presents President Bill Clinton with a coat of arms in 1995.

=== 21st century ===
Colin Powells coat of arms granted by the Lord Lyon King of Arms in 2004

- The Society of Scottish Armigers is founded in 2002 – it obtains a grant of arms from the Lord Lyon in 2004.
- The American Heraldry Society is founded in 2003 – it launches a journal, The American Herald, in 2006.
- U.S. Secretary of State Colin Powell receives a grant of arms from the Lord Lyon in 2004.
- The Lord Lyon grants corporate arms to Donald Trump via Trump International Golf Links, Scotland in 2011; Donald Trump becomes president of the United States in 2016.
- A coat of arms is devised by the College of Arms for Meghan Markle following her marriage to Prince Harry in 2018. The design reflects her birthplace of California.

== See also ==
- Armorial of presidents of the United States
- Armorial of vice presidents of the United States
- Coat of Arms of the United States
- United States Army Institute of Heraldry
- Naval heraldry
- English heraldry
