= Naval heraldry =

Form of identification of naval vessels

Naval heraldry is a form of identification used by naval vessels from the end of the 19th century onwards, after distinguishing features such as figureheads and gilding were discouraged or banned by several navies.

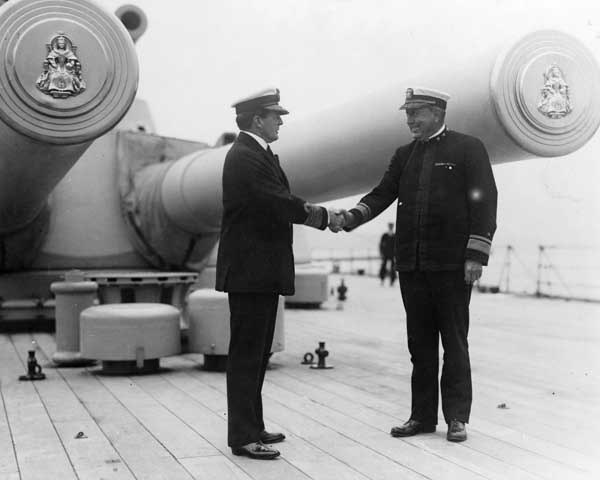
The badge of HMS Queen Elizabeth was displayed on the tampions of her main guns in 1917, before the standardisation of Royal Navy designs.

Naval heraldry commonly takes the form of a badge, seal, crest, or coat of arms designed specifically for a ship (Note: Although ships are commonly referred to in this article, identical or similar forms of heraldry are used for bases and facilities, organisational divisions, and land-based naval units.) (or a series of ships bearing the same name), which in Commonwealth navies takes the form of a large plaque, referred to as the ship's badge, mounted on the superstructure of the ship, and in the United States Navy is known as the ship's seal or ship's crest, and is primarily found on crew uniform patches.

An item of naval heraldry is seen as the identifying logo of the vessel, and is commonly reproduced on hats, stationery, trophies, souvenirs, and gifts related to the ship. In many navies, the ship's badge is also displayed on the tampions – the covers for the gun muzzles.

The naval heraldric tradition follows the heraldic traditions of the country, with some distinctive variations.

== Portuguese Navy ==
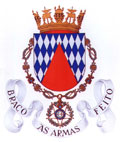
Coat of arms of the Marine Corps (Corpo de Fuzileiros) of the Portuguese Navy

The system of naval heraldry used by the Portuguese Navy was established and regulated in 1972, being slightly reviewed by an ordinance of February 18, 2010.

The coats of arms consist of a round tip shield (Portuguese shield), topped by a naval crown and under which is placed a scroll with the motto or the name of the body or unit. A scroll with the war cry of the unit can be placed above the naval crown. The coat of arms may also include tenants or supporters, trophies and decorations. A coat of arms can also be used as a badge, in which case an entirely round shield is used, surrounded by a branch of laurel on the right and by a branch of oak on the left.

The following bodies and units are entitled to the use of coat of arms:

1. The Portuguese Navy itself;
2. Naval and maritime zones commands;
3. Bodies dependent from the Naval Command led by officers with the rank of commander or higher;
4. Main bodies of the National Maritime Authority;
5. The Hydrographic Institute;
6. Superintendencies and directorates of the Navy
7. Corvettes, frigates, submarines, training ships and other ships commanded by officers with the rank of commander or higher;
8. Permanent naval forces and groups;
9. Other bodies of the Navy commanded by officers with the rank of captain or higher;
10. The Hospital of the Navy;
11. The Navy Staff;
12. The Navy Band;
13. Authorized non-permanent naval forces and marine forces commanded by officers with the rank of commander or higher;
14. Flag officers heads of bodies or units entitled to the use of coat of arms.

The coats of arms of the flag officers consist of the shield of the body or unit they command, replacing the naval crown for a helmet with a crest. The heraldic rank insignia of the officer (consisting of one or two anchors) is placed under the shield.

The commands and the units of the Portuguese Navy are also entitled to the use of heraldic flags, that – depending on the type of unit – can be in the form of a standard, a guidon or a pennon.

== Royal Australian Navy ==
The ship's badge of the Australian aircraft carrier HMAS Melbourne. This is the current (post 1975) version of the badge.

An item of naval heraldry in the Royal Australian Navy (RAN) is referred to as a ship's badge, although the incorrect ship's crest is sometimes used. Initially, the badges were designed and assigned to ships by the Royal Navy. After World War II, an Australian body, the Badges, Names and Honours Committee, was created to take responsibility for creating RAN ships' badges. At the first meeting, it was decided that all RAN badges would follow the Royal Navy format: a circle of rope in which the individual design would be placed, capped by a naval crown and a scroll with the ship's name. A second, longer scroll was located below the rope circle for the ship's motto. To identify the ship as Australian, the badge included a boomerang between the rope circle and motto scroll. The design was revised soon after to also incorporate a nulla nulla and a stone axe, intertwined with the boomerang.

Initially, there were gaps between the naval crown, name scroll, and rope circle. The name and motto scrolls were intended to be light blue with black lettering, although in practice they were painted dark blue, making the text hard to read. In 1964, the gaps between the crown, scroll, and circle were closed up, and the scrolls were changed to black with gold edging and lettering. The lettering style was also simplified. In 1970, a minor change was made to the naval crown, with one of the pennants on top of the sails altered to point left instead of right. Another minor change was made to the crown in 1974, with the curvature of the sails altered. In 1975, the weapons below the rope circle were reorganised so the nulla nulla and axe were superimposed over the boomerang, and were redrawn slightly: one of the major changes being thicker hafts on the crossed weapons.

=== Size and use ===
The badge for the office of Chief of Navy, a non-commissioned administrative division

Ship's badges are used equally by the RAN for ships, shore establishments, and organisations within the RAN. The standard badge measures 755 by 620 millimetres (29.7 by 24.4 in), with the rope circle having a diameter of 350 millimetres (14 in) from the outside edge and 295 millimetres (11.6 in) from the inside edge. "Boat's badges" were created for small craft belonging to a ship: the weapons and motto are omitted. Boat's badges are either 127 millimetres (5.0 in) or 203 millimetres (8.0 in) in diameter. Following the introduction of Attack-class patrol boats and Oberon-class submarines into the RAN fleet in the early 1960s, a scaled-down badge design was created for all commissioned ships of less than 40 metres (130 ft) in length and all submarines, measuring 440 by 365 millimetres (17.3 by 14.4 in) but with no other modifications. For the patrol boats, it was decided that a full-size badge was not appropriate for such small ships. The reduced size for submarines was a practical necessity: the badge had to fit through the external hatch, as it was only displayed on the fin while in port.

For non-commissioned units and establishments, an altered badge design was used. The first establishment to wear a non-commissioned badge was the RAN/RAAF Australian Joint Anti-Submarine School (AJASS) in 1967. Being a joint unit, it was decided that the badge design would be based on the RAAF unit badge, with a double circle of gold rope surrounding the collar on which the unit name was written, but with an alteration in colouring to the black and gold system used on the scrolls of ships' badges. The royal crown was used instead of the naval crown. The badge entered use with all non-commissioned RAN units, such as the dockyards, naval police, and administrative divisions. In 1979, all of the altered badges (excluding the joint-operated AJASS) were changed from the royal crown to the naval crown.

== Royal Danish Navy ==
Ship's badge for the frigate HDMS Iver Huitfeldt

Naval heraldry in the Royal Danish Navy can be traced back to the 17th century, when ships had elaborate transom decorations. With the introduction of steel ships, the tradition fell out of favour. There was a renewed interest in the heraldry in the 1930s. However, the outbreak of World War II halted any work. Following a visit to Rotterdam in June 1950, Danish sailors expressed wishes to reintroduce heraldry to the Navy's ships for easier recognition and to increase cohesion on the ships. Following a number of work-groups to determine design, a standard template was produced on 26 April 1957 and was approved by the King on the 15 June 1957. On 15 April 1959, the first 15 ships' badges were approved by the King. In 1961, designs for other naval institution badges were approved.

== Royal Canadian Navy ==
Ships in the Royal Canadian Navy receive badges, specifically designed for each ship. Using a circular design, they are topped with the naval crown and surrounded by a gold rope. Three maple leaves at the bottom of the rope circle distinguish Canadian badges from those of other Commonwealth navies.

During World War II, the number of ships being built and commissioned outstripped the ability of a central authority to design and approve. Local authority to the commanding officers of the ships resulted in humorous and risque badges, including some cartoon characters. These badges are not considered to be official.

Currently, all badges are reviewed by the Director of Ceremonial and recommended to the Governor General.

CFB Esquimalt Naval & Military Museum has an extensive collection of official Canadian naval ship, naval establishments and naval air unit badges 1910-1948.

== Royal Norwegian Navy ==
It is customary for each individual ship and other units in the Royal Norwegian Navy to receive an individually designed coat of arms. These coats of arms follow the Norwegian heraldic tradition of being very simple in design. They often feature only one colour, one metal and one motive. They all have the same shield shape and are surrounded by a rope. The shield is surmounted by the heraldic Crown of Norway atop the ship's name.

The design of the individual shield is often inspired by connections the ship name gives. HNoMS Fridtjof Nansen is given a shield inspired by the family coat of arms of the Nansen family. Others are given shields based on the unit's function. The Naval Schools have a shield depicting a golden anchor and two silver torches of wisdom. All naval coats of arms have to be approved by the King of Norway.

== Royal Navy ==
During the Age of Sail, ships were identified by figureheads and gilded carvings. However, the extravagance of these decorations began to reach the point of flamboyance, and an Admiralty directive in the early 18th century restricted the amount that could be spent, and eventually banned it outright.

Ships' badges first appeared in the 1850s, as identification markings on the stationery used by some Royal Navy ships. These marks were quickly used to mark the boats assigned to a ship, to aid crew in finding their boat at a dark or crowded wharf. The creation of badges was haphazard, and eventually came into use for the ships themselves. In 1918, Charles ffoulkes, the curator of the newly established Imperial War Museum was asked by the commanding officer of HMS Tower to design a badge for his ship. He quickly received requests to create badges for other Royal Navy vessels, and on 10 December 1918, ffoulkes was appointed the Admiralty advisor on heraldry. Shortly prior to this, a Ships' Badge Committee had been established to regulate the creation and use of ships' badges.

In 1919 the badges were standardized as four shapes: Circular (battleships & battlecruisers), Pentagonal (cruisers), Shield (destroyers) and Diamond (all other types and shore establishments).

Testing was carried out to ensure that the badges were designed appropriately to identify ships. Cardboard mockups were created, gilded, and installed on a police launch, which was observed on patrol of the Thames by a captured German submarine moored outside the Palace of Westminster. It was decided to use different shapes to identify different types of vessel: circles for battleships, pentagons for cruisers, U-shaped shields for destroyers, and diamonds for auxiliary units, including depot ships, small war vessels, and aircraft carriers.

In 1940, the designs for all ships were standardised to a circular design. This was primarily due to wartime shortages, although another factor was to eliminate difficulties caused when a ship was commissioned with a previously used name but was a different type of vessel, requiring the badge to be redesigned for the new shape. At the same time, the use of scaled-down badges for a ship's boats was suspended, and as of 2000 has not been resumed. After the war, the pentagonal badge shape was assigned to Royal Fleet Auxiliary vessels, and the diamond to commissioned shore bases. Before World War II, the design of badges for ships in other Commonwealth navies was the responsibility of the Royal Navy Ships' Badge Committee, but this responsibility was assigned to the relevant nations after the war.

Ships' badges are reused along with the ship name. When the monarch approves the name of a new ship, they will also approve the new ship's badge, which may have changed if the shape needs to change.

HMS Chatham was a ship serving in the Royal Navy with an original badge, since none of the previous Chathams bore a badge.

== South African Navy ==
A few ships of the South African Navy adopted badges during World War II, but they appear to have been unofficial. Only one, that of the reserve base HMSAS Unitie, conformed to the Royal Navy pattern of enclosing the badge in a U-shaped frame of golden cable, ensigned of a naval crown resting on a name plaque.

Badges were formalised after the war, the Royal Navy model being followed. At first, badges were diamond-shaped, but after a few years they were changed to circular frames. Unitie retained her shield-shaped badge, and in the 1980s, pentagonal badges were introduced for Navy Headquarters and the headquarters of the regional commands. The naval crown was replaced by the red lion crest of the national coat of arms in 1954, and this in turn was replaced by the secretary-bird crest of the new national arms in 2002.

Where ships and shore units are named after provinces and towns, their badges incorporate elements of the provincial or civic arms, for example the ox-wagon in the badge of the frigate SAS Transvaal. Those named after historical personalities incorporate their namesakes' personal coats of arms, or elements of their arms, in their badges, for example the shield of the Van Riebeeck arms in the badge of the destroyer SAS Jan van Riebeeck. For some categories of ships, including the Daphné-class submarines, Minister-class strike craft, and River-class minehunters, standard badges were designed, which were then differenced to identify individual vessels. The submarines' badges depicted a trident (emblem of the submarine branch) surmounted by a lozenge displaying the arms of the lady after whom the vessel was named. The strike craft badges depict a Viking longboat in full sail, with elements of the arms of the cabinet minister after which the ship was named on the sail. The minehunters' badges depict a bridge across a river, with an additional device above the bridge alluding to the name of the river.

Badges are designed and approved by the South African National Defence Force's heraldry section, and registered at the Bureau of Heraldry to provide legal protection against misuse.

== United States Navy ==
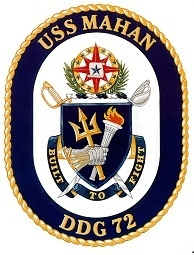
A uniform patch showing the coat of arms of the United States destroyer USS Mahan

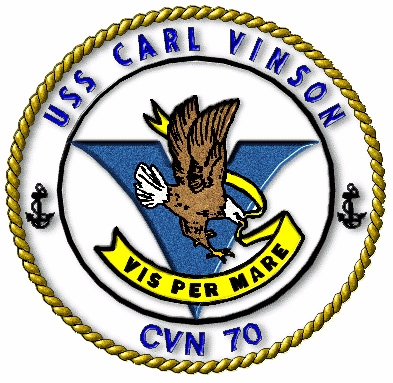
Crest of the United States aircraft carrier USS Carl Vinson

It is the custom in the United States Navy (USN) for ships, bases and other commands to receive an individually designed heraldic emblem. Due to heraldic traditions in the U.S., these emblems usually take the form of seals or crests; the terms are used often interchangeably, although the emblems are different. These items of naval heraldry are most commonly found on uniform patches for the ship's crew; unlike ships in Commonwealth navies, which display their symbols on plaques and battle honor boards fixed to the superstructure of the ship, USN ships are not allowed to paint or otherwise fix the ship's heraldry to the exterior of the ship.

From World War I to the beginning of World War II, some U.S. Navy ships had these insignia, but World War II brought them into general use. Some designs were created by the ship's personnel, while others were commissioned by professional artists. The Korean War saw another upsurge in interest in crests and coats of arms. In the 1950s and 1960s, OPNAVINST 5030.2B encouraged ships to design their own crests, and laid out the procedure for receiving official approval.

Today, the prospective commanding officers of new ships are responsible for designing the crests and submitting them for approval. They have great leeway in determining the design, and may optionally use the services of the U.S. Army's heraldry branch. Seals for destroyers tend to be oval in shape, whereas seals for submarines and aircraft carriers tend to be circular. Littoral combat ship and aircraft carrier crests also tend to feature a profile illustration of the ship on the crest, whereas destroyer crests do not.

== See also ==
- Seal (emblem)
- United States Heraldry
