= List of personal coats of arms of presidents of the United States =

Many United States presidents have borne a coat of arms; largely through inheritance, assumption, or grants from foreign heraldic authorities.

The President of the United States, as a position, uses the presidential seal as a coat of arms, but this is a coat of arms of office, not a personal coat of arms.

== Arms of presidents by century ==
=== 18th century ===
Arms	Name of president and blazon
	Arms of George Washington, 1st president, 1789–1797 Shield: Argent, two bars and in chief three mullets gules Crest: Out of a crest-coronet a raven rising wings elevated and addorsed proper Motto: Exitus Acta Probat (The outcome is the test of the act) See also: Washington family arms
	Arms of John Adams, 2nd president, 1797–1801 Shield: Gules, six crosses-crosslet fitchy argent, on a chief or three pellets, the center one charged with a fleur-de-lis and the other two with lions passant guardant argent Crest: A lion passant holding in his dexter paw a cross-crosslet fitchy argent Motto: Libertatem Amicitiam Retinebis, Et Fidem (Freedom and friendship thou shall preserve, and faith) Connections to other presidents' arms: Same as the 4th (Boylston) quartering in the arms used by his son, John Quincy Adams

=== 19th century ===
Arms	Name of president and blazon
	Arms of Thomas Jefferson, 3rd president, 1801–1809 Shield: Azure, a fret argent and on a chief gules three leopards' faces argent Crest: A lion's head erased or Motto: Ab Eo Libertas A Quo Spiritus (The one who gives life gives liberty)
	James Madison, 4th president, 1809–1817 Shield: Argent, two halberts in saltire sable Motto: Veritas non verba magistri (Truth, not the word of masters)
	James Monroe, 5th president, 1817–1825 No arms known
	Arms of John Quincy Adams, 6th president, 1825–1829 Shield: Quarterly: 1st argent, on a mount vert a stag trippant toward a pine tree, in base a codfish naiant on a sea all proper, overall thirteen stars in annulet azure (for Adams); 2nd sable, a fess cotised between three martlets or (for Smith); 3rd gules, seven mascles conjoined 3, 3, and 1 or (for Quincy); 4th gules, six crosses-crosslet fitchy argent, on a chief or three pellets, the center one charged with a fleur-de-lis and the outer two with lions passant guardant argent (for Boylston) Crest: A lion passant holding in his dexter paw a cross-crosslet fitchy argent, langued and armed gules Motto: Fidem Libertatem Amicitiam Retinebis (Faith, freedom and friendship thou shall preserve) Connections to other presidents' arms: 4th (Boylston) quartering in the arms of his father, John Adams
	Andrew Jackson, 7th president, 1829–1837 No arms known
	Arms of Martin Van Buren, 8th president, 1837–1841 Shield: Per pale or and gules, in dexter a greyhound rampant contourny and in sinister two bars embattled-counterembattled, all counterchanged Crest: A greyhound rampant between two wings, the dexter gules, the sinister or
	Arms of William Henry Harrison, 9th president, 1841 Shield: Or, on a fess sable three eagles displayed or, a crescent sable for difference Crest: An eagle's head erased or Connections to other presidents' arms: Same arms as used by his grandson, Benjamin Harrison
	John Tyler, 10th president, 1841–1845 No arms known
	James K. Polk, 11th president, 1845–1849 No arms known
	Crest of Zachary Taylor, 12th president, 1849–1850 Crest: A naked arm embowed holding an arrow proper Motto: Consequitur Quodcumque Petit (Seize whatever follows)
	Millard Fillmore, 13th president, 1850–1853 No arms known
	Franklin Pierce, 14th president, 1853–1857 No arms known
—N/a	Arms of James Buchanan, 15th president, 1857–1861 Shield: Or, a lion rampant sable armed and langued gules holding in his dexter paw a cap of honour turned up ermine surmounted by a rose gules, all within a double tressure flory-counterflory sable Crest: A dexter Hand holding a Scimitar proper Motto: Audacia Et Industria (By boldness and effort)
—N/a	Arms of Abraham Lincoln, 16th president, 1861–1865 Shield: Or, a leopard rampant sable armed argent Further information: Lincoln arms in Swanton Morley Church
	Andrew Johnson, 17th president, 1865–1869 No arms known
—N/a	Arms of Ulysses S. Grant, 18th president, 1869–1877 Shield: Gules, a chevron ermine between three fleurs-de-lys or Crest: A burning hill proper Motto: Stand fast
	Crest of Rutherford B. Hayes, 19th president, 1877–1881 Crest: Upon an anvil a falcon rising proper Motto: Recte (Right) Additional motto: Qui Patriæ Optime Servit Optime Servit Suis Partibus (He who serves his party best serves his country best) Clan: Hay
	Arms of James A. Garfield, 20th president, 1881 Shield: Or, three bars gules, on a canton ermine a cross paty gules Crest: Issuant from a human heart a dexter hand holding a sword proper Motto: In Cruce Vinco (In the cross I conquer)
	Arms of Chester A. Arthur, 21st president, 1881–1885 Shield: Gules, a chevron argent between three rests [clarions] or Crest: A falcon rising proper belled and jessed or Motto: Impelle Obstantia (Thrust aside obstacles)
	Arms of Grover Cleveland, 22nd and 24th president, 1885–1889 and 1893–1897 Shield: Per chevron sable and ermine, a chevron engrailed counterchanged Crest: A demi-old man proper habited azure, on his head a cap gules turned up with hair front, holding in his dexter hand a spear, the head argent, on the top of which is fixed a line proper passing behind him and coiled up in his sinister hand Motto: Semel Et Semper (Once and always) Alternative mottoes: Pro Deo Et Patria (For God and country); Vincit Amor Patriæ (Love of country conquers)
	Arms of Benjamin Harrison, 23rd president, 1889–1893 Shield: Or, on a fess sable three eagles displayed or, a crescent sable for difference Crest: An Eagle's Head erased or Connections to other presidents' arms: Same as the arms used by his paternal grandfather, William Henry Harrison
	William McKinley, 25th president, 1897–1901 No arms known

=== 20th century ===
Arms	Name of president and blazon
	Arms of Theodore Roosevelt, 26th president, 1901–1909 Shield: Argent, upon a grassy mound a rose bush proper bearing three roses gules barbed and seeded proper Crest: Three ostrich plumes each per pale gules and argent Motto: Qui Plantavit Curabit (He who planted will preserve) Symbolism: The Roosevelt arms feature a rose bush in reference to the name: "Roosevelt", which is archaic Dutch for "rose field", making these an example of canting arms. Connections to other presidents' arms: Similar to the arms used by his distant cousin Franklin Delano Roosevelt, the primary difference being the depiction of a grassy mound in Theodore's arms
	William Howard Taft, 27th president, 1909–1913 No arms known
	Woodrow Wilson, 28th president, 1913–1921 No arms known
	Warren G. Harding, 29th president, 1921–1923 No arms known
	Arms of Calvin Coolidge, 30th president, 1923–1929 Shield: Vert, a griffin segreant or Crest: A demi-griffin segreant or Motto: Virtute Et Fide (By valor and faith) Note: Attributed by Henry Bond MD, no evidence Coolidge ever bore these arms
	Herbert Hoover, 31st president, 1929–1933 No arms known
	Arms of Franklin D. Roosevelt, 32nd president, 1933–1945 Shield: Argent, three roses one in pale and two in saltire gules, barbed, seeded, slipped, and leaved proper Crest: Three ostrich plumes each per pale gules and argent Motto: Qui Plantavit Curabit (He who planted will preserve) Symbolism: The Roosevelt arms feature a rose bush in reference to the name: "Roosevelt", which is Dutch for "rose field", making these an example of canting arms. Connections to other presidents' arms: Similar to the arms used by his distant cousin Theodore Roosevelt, which were differenced by the depiction of a grassy mound
	Harry S. Truman, 33rd president, 1945–1953 No arms known
	Arms of Dwight D. Eisenhower, 34th president, 1953–1961 Shield: Or, an anvil azure Crest: Five stars of five points conjoined as on the points of a pentagram argent Motto: Peace Through Understanding Foreign honors: The Bath Circlet encircled by the Collar of the Order of the Elephant surrounding the Shield and suspended below by its ribbon the insignia of the British Order of Merit Symbolism: The anvil alludes to the German origin of his name: Eisenhauer, meaning "iron hewer". The five stars come from his rank insignia Eisenhower wore as a General of the Army during World War II. Note: Adopted following being invested with the Order of the Elephant in 1950
	Arms of John F. Kennedy, 35th president, 1961–1963 Shield: Sable, three helmets in profile or within a bordure per saltire gules and ermine Crest: Between two Olive branches a Cubit sinister arm in armor erect, the hand holding a Sheaf of four Arrows, points upward, all proper Symbolism: The Kennedy arms allude to their supposed descent from the O'Kennedys of Ormonde. Note: Granted by the Chief Herald of Ireland in 1961
	Arms of Lyndon B. Johnson, 36th president, 1963–1969 Shield: Azure, on a saltire gules fimbriated argent between four eagles displayed a mullet or Crest: An armed hand argent supporting an eagle rising or Motto: Nobilitatis virtus non stemma character (Virtue, not lineage, is the mark of nobility) Note: Granted by the American College of Heraldry and Arms in 1968
	Richard Nixon, 37th president, 1969–1974 No arms known
	Gerald Ford, 38th president, 1974–1977 No arms known
	Jimmy Carter, 39th president, 1977–1981 No arms known
	Arms of Ronald Reagan, 40th president, 1981–1989 Shield: Or, a bear rampant sable armed and langued gules holding between its forepaws a star argent, on a chief sable standing upon a ducal coronet or a falcon's wings displayed and inverted argent armed or and langued gules Crest: A demi-horse forcené sable unguled or and charged on the shoulder with an actor's mask or Motto: Facta non verba (Deeds, not words) Foreign honors: Surrounding the Shield the Collar of the Order of the Bath
	George H. W. Bush, 41st president, 1989–1993 No arms proven Foreign honors: The Collar of the Order of the Bath
	Arms of Bill Clinton, 42nd president, 1993–2001 Shield: Or, a lion rampant gules charged with three bars argent holding in the dexter paw an olive branch proper between in the dexter chief and sinister base a cross-crosslet fitchy sable and in the sinister chief and dexter base a shamrock slipped vert Crest: An anchor erect azure, on the stock the letters SPES argent Motto: An leon do bheir an chraobh (The lion carries away the branch) Foreign honors: Surrounding the Shield the Collar of the Order of the White Lion Note: Granted by the Chief Herald of Ireland in 1995

=== 21st century ===
Arms	Name of president and blazon
	George W. Bush, 43rd president, 2001–2009 No arms proven
	Barack Obama, 44th president, 2009–2017 No arms known
	Donald Trump, 45th and 47th president, 2017–2021 and 2025–present Assumed, differenced arms; no granted personal arms known (Note: Since acquiring the resort of Mar-a-Lago in 1985, Donald Trump has made use of both the principal and differenced versions of the Davies armorial achievement, granted by the College of Arms. The undifferenced arms belong to the male primogeniture of the predeceased spouse of the former owner of the estate. Differenced arms were registered with the U.S. Patent and Trademark Office and have been used across golf courses and properties operated by The Trump Organization. To comply with Scottish heraldic laws, Trump International Golf Club Scotland Ltd applied for and was granted arms by the Court of the Lord Lyon in 2011.) See also: The Trump Organization § Coats of arms
	Joe Biden, 46th president, 2021–2025 No arms known

== See also ==
- American heraldry
- Armorial of the United States
- Seal of the president of the United States
- Armorial of vice presidents of the United States
- Armorial of the governors general of Canada
- Armorial of prime ministers of the United Kingdom
