= List of personal coats of arms of vice presidents of the United States =

Several United States vice presidents have borne a coat of arms; largely through inheritance, assumption, or grants from foreign heraldic authorities. The vice president of the United States, as a position, uses the vice presidential seal as a coat of arms, though this is a coat of arms of office, not a personal coat of arms.

== Arms of vice presidents by century ==
=== 18th century ===
Arms	Name of vice president and blazon
	Arms of John Adams, 1st vice president, 1789–1797 Shield: Gules six crosses-crosslet fitchy Argent, on a chief Or three pellets, the center one charged with a fleur-de-lys and the other two with lions passant guardant Argent Crest: A Lion passant holding in his dexter paw a cross-crosslet fitchy Argent Motto: Libertatem amicitiam retinebis et fidem (Freedom, friendship and fidelity)
	Arms of Thomas Jefferson, 2nd vice president, 1797–1801 Shield: Azure a fret and on a chief Gules three leopards' faces Argent Crest: A lion's head erased Or Motto: Ab eo libertas a quo spiritus (The one who gives life gives liberty)

=== 19th century ===
Arms	Name of vice president and blazon
—N/a	Aaron Burr, 3rd vice president, 1801–1805 No arms known
	Arms of George Clinton, 4th vice president, 1805–1812 Shield: Argent, six cross crosslets fitchy Sable on a chief Azure two mullets Or pierced Gules Crest: Out of a ducal coronet Gules a plume of five ostrich feathers Argent banded by a ribbon Azure Motto: Cara patria, carior libertas (Dear fatherland, dearer freedom)
—N/a	Elbridge Gerry, 5th vice president, 1813–1814 No arms known
	Arms of Daniel D. Tompkins, 6th vice president, 1817–1825 Shield: Azure, on a chevron between three cock-pheasants close Or three cross-crosslets Sable Crest: A unicorn's head, erased, per fess, Argent and Or, armed and maned, counterchanged, gorged with a chaplet of laurel, Vert
	Arms of John C. Calhoun, 7th vice president, 1825–1832 Shield: Argent, a saltire engrailed Sable Crest: A hart's head couped Gules attired Argent Supporters: Two ratch-hounds Argent, collared Sable Motto: Si je puis (If I may)
	Arms of Martin Van Buren, 8th vice president, 1833–1837 Shield: Per pale, Or a greyhound rampant contourny Gules, and Gules two bars embattled-counterembattled Or Crest: A greyhound rampant between the wings of a vol Gules and Or
—N/a	Richard Mentor Johnson, 9th vice president, 1837–1841 No arms known
—N/a	John Tyler, 10th vice president, 1841 No arms known
—N/a	George M. Dallas, 11th vice president, 1845–1849 No arms known
—N/a	Millard Fillmore, 12th vice president, 1849–1850 No arms known
—N/a	William R. King, 13th vice president, 1853 No arms known
—N/a	John C. Breckinridge, 14th vice president, 1857–1861 No arms known
—N/a	Hannibal Hamlin, 15th vice president, 1861–1865 No arms known
—N/a	Andrew Johnson, 16th vice president, 1865 No arms known
—N/a	Schuyler Colfax, 17th vice president, 1869–1873 No arms known
—N/a	Henry Wilson, 18th vice president, 1873–1875 No arms known
—N/a	William A. Wheeler, 19th vice president, 1877–1881 No arms known
	Arms of Chester A. Arthur, 20th vice president, 1881 Shield: Gules a chevron Argent between three rests (clarions) Or Crest: A falcon rising proper belled and jessed Or Motto: Impelle obstantia (Thrust aside obstacles)
—N/a	Thomas A. Hendricks, 21st vice president, 1885 No arms known
—N/a	Levi P. Morton, 22nd vice president, 1889–1893 No arms known
—N/a	Adlai Stevenson I, 23rd vice president, 1893–1897 No arms known
—N/a	Garret Hobart, 24th vice president, 1897–1899 No arms known

=== 20th century ===
Arms	Name of vice president and blazon
	Arms of Theodore Roosevelt, 25th vice president, 1901 Shield: Argent upon a grassy mound a rose bush proper bearing three roses Gules barbed and seeded proper Crest: From a wreath Argent and Gules three ostrich plumes each per pale Gules and Argent Motto: Qui plantavit curabit (He who planted will preserve)
—N/a	Charles W. Fairbanks, 26th vice president, 1905–1909 No known arms
	Arms of James S. Sherman, 27th vice president, 1909–1912 Shield: Or, a Lion rampant Sable between three oak leaves Vert Crest: A sea lion, sejant Sable charged on the shoulder with three bezants, two and one
—N/a	Thomas R. Marshall, 28th vice president, 1913–1921 No arms known
	Arms of Calvin Coolidge, 29th vice president, 1921–1923: Attributed by Henry Bond, no evidence Coolidge ever bore these arms Shield: Vert a griffin segreant Or Crest: A demi-griffin segreant Or Motto: Virtute et fide (By valor and faith)
—N/a	Charles G. Dawes, 30th vice president, 1925–1929 No arms known
—N/a	Charles Curtis, 31st vice president, 1929–1933 No arms known
—N/a	John Nance Garner, 32nd vice president, 1933–1941 No arms known
—N/a	Henry A. Wallace, 33rd vice president, 1941–1945 No arms known
—N/a	Harry S. Truman, 34th vice president, 1945 No arms known
—N/a	Alben W. Barkley, 35th vice president, 1949–1953 No arms known
—N/a	Arms of Richard Nixon, 36th vice president, 1953–1961 No known arms
	Arms of Lyndon B. Johnson, 37th vice president, 1961–1963 Shield: Azure on a saltire Gules fimbriated Argent between four eagles displayed a mullet Or Crest: On a wreath of the colors an armed hand Argent supporting an eagle rising Or Motto: Nobilitatis virtus non stemma character (Virtue, not lineage, is the mark of nobility)
—N/a	Hubert Humphrey, 38th vice president, 1965–1969: No arms known
	Arms of Spiro Agnew, 39th vice president, 1969–1973 Shield: Azure, on a cross between four horses' heads couped Argent, a cross botonny Gules Crest: A hand couped proper holding a sceptre of office Supporters: Dexter a Greek statesman and sinister a Greek warrior both proper Motto: Do all good
—N/a	Gerald Ford, 40th vice president, 1973–1974 No arms known
—N/a	Nelson Rockefeller, 41st vice president, 1974–1977 No arms known
—N/a	Walter Mondale, 42nd vice president, 1977–1981 No arms known
—N/a	George H. W. Bush, 43rd vice president, 1981–1989 No arms known
—N/a	Dan Quayle, 44th vice president, 1989–1993 No arms known
—N/a	Al Gore, 45th vice president, 1993–2001 No arms known

=== 21st century ===
Arms	Name of vice president and blazon
—N/a	Dick Cheney, 46th vice president, 2001–2009 No arms known
—N/a	Joe Biden, 47th vice president, 2009–2017 No arms known
—N/a	Mike Pence, 48th vice president, 2017–2021 No arms known
—N/a	Kamala Harris, 49th vice president, 2021–2025 No arms known
—N/a	JD Vance, 50th vice president, 2025–present No arms known

== See also ==
- American heraldry
- Armorial of the United States
- Coat of Arms of the United States
- U.S. Army Institute of Heraldry
- Armorial of presidents of the United States
- Armorial of the governors general of Canada
- Armorial of prime ministers of the United Kingdom
