= 1973 oil crisis =

OAPEC petroleum embargo

The price of West Texas Intermediate from 1950 to 2000, adjusted for inflation (1947 prices)

In October 1973, the Organization of Arab Petroleum Exporting Countries (OAPEC) announced that it was implementing a total oil embargo against countries that had supported Israel at any point during the 1973 Yom Kippur War, which began after Egypt and Syria launched a large-scale surprise attack in an ultimately unsuccessful attempt to recover the territories that they had lost to Israel during the 1967 Six-Day War.

In an effort that was led by Faisal of Saudi Arabia, the initial countries that OAPEC targeted were Canada, Japan, the Netherlands, the United Kingdom, and the United States. This list was later expanded to include Portugal, Rhodesia, and South Africa.

In March 1974, OAPEC lifted the embargo, but the price of oil had risen by nearly 300%: from US$3/barrel to nearly US$12/barrel globally. Prices in the United States were significantly higher than the global average. After it was implemented, the embargo caused an oil crisis, or "shock", with many short- and long-term effects on the global economy as well as on global politics. The 1973 embargo later came to be referred to as the first oil shock. A second oil shock occurred in 1979 in the aftermath of the Iranian Revolution.

== Background ==
=== Arab-Israeli conflict ===
Following the Israeli Declaration of Independence in 1948, there has been conflict between Arabs and Israelis in the Middle East, including several wars. The Suez Crisis, also known as the Second Arab–Israeli war, was sparked by Israel's southern port of Eilat being blocked by Egypt, which also nationalized the Suez Canal belonging to French and British investors. As a result of the war, the Suez Canal was closed for several months between 1956 and 1957.

The Six-Day War of 1967 included an Israeli invasion of the Egyptian Sinai Peninsula, which resulted in Egypt closing the Suez Canal for eight years. Following the Yom Kippur War, the canal was cleared in 1974 and opened again in 1975. OAPEC countries cut production of oil and placed an embargo on oil exports to the United States after Richard Nixon requested $2.2 billion to support Israel's war effort. Nevertheless, the embargo lasted only until January 1974, though the price of oil remained high afterwards.

=== American oil production decline ===
By 1969, American domestic production of oil was peaking and could not keep pace with increasing demand from vehicles. The US was importing 350 million barrels (56 million cubic metres) per year by the late 1950s, mostly from Venezuela and Canada. Because of transportation costs and tariffs, it never purchased much oil from the Middle East. In 1973, US production had declined to 16% of global output. Eisenhower imposed quotas on foreign oil that would stay in place between 1959 and 1973.

Critics called it the "drain America first" policy. Some scholars believe the policy contributed to the decline of domestic US oil production in the early 1970s. The cheapness of oil compared with coal led to the decline of the coal industry. In 1951, 51% of the United States' energy came from coal, and by 1973, only 19% of American industry was coal-based. The decline in domestic oil production, combined with the country's increasing reliance on oil as a source of power, made the US economy vulnerable to a foreign oil embargo.

When Richard Nixon became US president in 1969, he assigned George Shultz to head a committee to review the Eisenhower-era quota program. Shultz's committee recommended that the quotas be abolished and replaced with tariffs, but Nixon decided to keep the quotas due to vigorous political opposition. Nixon imposed a price ceiling on oil in August 1971 as demand for oil was increasing and production was declining, which increased dependence on oil imports as consumption was bolstered by low prices. In 1973, Nixon announced the end of the quota system. Between 1970 and 1973 US imports of crude oil had nearly doubled, reaching 6.2 million barrels per day in 1973. Until 1973, an abundance of oil supply had kept the market price of oil lower than the posted price.

In 1970, American oil production peaked and the United States began to import more oil. Oil imports rose by 52% between 1969 and 1972. By 1972, 83% of the American oil imports came from the Middle East. Throughout the 1960s, the price for a barrel of oil remained at $1.80, meaning that with the effects of inflation considered the price of oil in real terms got progressively lower throughout the decade, with Americans paying less for oil in 1969 than they had in 1959. Even after a price for a barrel of oil rose to $2.00 in 1971, adjusted for inflation, people in the Western nations were paying less for oil in 1971 than they had in 1958. The extremely low price of oil served as the basis for the "long summer" of prosperity and mass affluence that began in 1945.

=== OPEC ===
The Organization of Petroleum Exporting Countries (OPEC), was founded by five oil producing countries at a Baghdad conference on 14 September 1960. The five founding members of OPEC were Venezuela, Iraq, Saudi Arabia, Iran and Kuwait. OPEC was organized after the oil companies slashed the posted price of oil, but the posted price of oil remained consistently higher than the market price of oil between 1961 and 1972.

In 1963, the Seven Sisters controlled 86% of the oil produced by OPEC countries, but by 1970 the rise of "independent oil companies" had decreased their share to 77%. The entry of three new oil producers—Algeria, Libya and Nigeria—meant that by 1970, 81 oil companies were doing business in the Middle East.

In the early 1960s Libya, Indonesia and Qatar joined OPEC. OPEC was generally regarded as ineffective until political turbulence in Libya and Iraq strengthened their position in 1970. Additionally, increasing Soviet influence provided oil producing countries with alternative means of transporting oil to markets.

Under the Tehran Price Agreement of 1971, signed on 14 February, the posted price of oil was increased and, due to a decline in the value of the US dollar relative to gold, certain anti-inflationary measures were enacted.

A severe drain on US gold reserves lead to higher inflation and lack of confidence in the strength of the dollar, President Nixon issued Executive Order 11615 on August 15, 1971, which closed the gold window. This action made the dollar inconvertible to gold directly, except on the open market, and was soon dubbed the Nixon Shock, leading eventually to the collapse of the Bretton Woods system in 1976. Because oil was priced in dollars, oil producers' real income decreased when the dollar started to float free of the old link to gold. In September 1971, OPEC issued a joint communiqué stating that from then on, they would price oil in terms of a fixed amount of gold.

After 1971, OPEC was slow to readjust prices to reflect this depreciation. From 1947 to 1967, the dollar price of oil had risen by less than two percent per year. Until the oil shock, the price had also remained fairly stable versus other currencies and commodities. OPEC ministers had not developed institutional mechanisms to update prices in sync with changing market conditions, so their real incomes lagged. The substantial price increases of 1973–1974 largely returned their prices and corresponding incomes to former levels in terms of commodities such as gold.

=== Countdown to the October War ===
Arab oil producing countries had attempted to use oil as leverage to influence political events on two prior occasions—the first was the Suez Crisis in 1956 when the United Kingdom, France and Israel invaded Egypt. During the conflict the Syrians sabotaged both the Trans-Arabian Pipeline and the Iraq–Baniyas pipeline, which disrupted the supply of oil to Western Europe. The second instance was when war broke out between Egypt and Israel in 1967, but despite continued Egyptian and Syrian enmity against Israel, the embargo lasted only a few months. Most scholars agree that the 1967 embargo was ineffective.

Although some members of the Organization of Arab Petroleum Exporting Countries (OAPEC) supported the use of oil as a weapon to influence the political outcome of the Arab–Israeli conflict, Saudi Arabia had traditionally been the strongest supporter of separating oil from politics. The Saudis were wary of the tactic due to the availability of oil from non-Arab oil producing countries, and in the decades leading up to the crisis, the region's conservative monarchies had grown dependent on Western support to ensure their continued survival as Nasserism gained traction. On the other hand, Algeria, Iraq and Libya had strongly supported the use of oil as a weapon in the conflict. Arab newspapers like the Egyptian Al-Ahram, Lebanese An-Nahar and Iraqi Al-Thawra had historically been supportive of the use of oil as a weapon.

In 1970, President Nasser of Egypt died and was succeeded by Anwar Sadat, a man who believed in the diplomacy of surprise, in engaging in sudden moves to upset the diplomatic equilibrium. Sadat liked to say that his favourite game was backgammon, a game where skill and persistence was rewarded, but was best won by sudden gambles, making an analogy between how he played backgammon and conducted his diplomacy. Under Nasser, Egypt and Saudi Arabia had engaged what was known as the Arab Cold War, but Sadat got along very well with King Faisal of Saudi Arabia, forming an alliance between the most populous Arab state and the wealthiest Arab state.

Unlike the secularist Nasser, Sadat was a pious Muslim and he had a strong personal rapport with King Faisal, who was an equally pious Muslim. The man largely in charge of American foreign policy, the National Security Adviser, Henry Kissinger, later admitted that he was so engrossed with the Paris peace talks to end the Vietnam war that he and others in Washington missed the significance of the Egyptian-Saudi alliance. At the same time that Sadat moved closer to Saudi Arabia, he also wanted a rapprochement with the United States and to move Egypt away from its alliance with the Soviet Union.

In 1971, the US had information that the Arab states were willing to implement another embargo. In July 1972, Sadat expelled all 16,000 of the Soviet military personnel in Egypt in a signal that he wanted better relations with the United States. Kissinger was taken completely by surprise by Sadat's move, saying: "Why has he done me this favor? Why didn't he demand all sorts of concessions first?"

Sadat expected as a reward that the United States would respond by pressuring Israel to return the Sinai to Egypt, but after his anti-Soviet move prompted no response from the United States, by November 1972 Sadat moved again closer to the Soviet Union, buying a massive amount of Soviet arms for a war he planned to launch against Israel in 1973. For Sadat, cost was no object as the money to buy Soviet arms came from Saudi Arabia. At the same time, Faisal promised Sadat that if it should come to war, Saudi Arabia would embargo oil to the West. In April 1973, the Saudi Oil Minister Ahmed Zaki Yamani visited Washington to meet Kissinger and told him that King Faisal was becoming more and more unhappy with the United States, saying he wanted America to pressure Israel to return all the lands captured in the Six Day War of 1967.

In a later interview, Yamani accused Kissinger of not taking his warning seriously, saying all he did was to ask him not to speak anymore of this threat. Angry at Kissinger, Yamani, in an interview with the Washington Post on April 19, 1973, warned that King Faisal was considering an oil embargo. At the time, the general feeling in Washington was the Saudis were bluffing and nothing would come of their threat to impose an oil embargo. The fact that Faisal's ineffectual half brother King Saud had imposed a crippling oil embargo on Britain and France during the Suez War of 1956 was not considered an important precedent.

The CEOs of four of the United States' oil companies, after speaking with Faisal, arrived in Washington in May 1973 with the warning that Faisal was considerably tougher, more intelligent and more ruthless than his half-brother Saud whom he had deposed in 1964, and that his threats were serious. Kissinger declined to meet the four CEOs. In an assessment done by Kissinger and his staff about the Middle East in the summer of 1973, the repeated statements by Sadat about waging jihad against Israel were dismissed as empty talk, while the warnings from King Faisal were likewise regarded as inconsequential.

In September 1973, Nixon fired Rogers as Secretary of State and replaced him with Kissinger. Kissinger later stated he had not been given enough time to know the Middle East, as he settled into the State Department's office at Foggy Bottom as Egypt and Syria attacked Israel on 6 October 1973.

== The war and the "oil weapon" ==
On 6 October 1973, the Yom Kippur began when Egypt attacked the Bar Lev Line in the Sinai Peninsula and Syria launched an offensive in the Golan Heights, both of which had been occupied by Israel during the 1967 Six-Day War. Faisal of Saudi Arabia was supportive, and on 8 October 1973, he told two Egyptian envoys: "You have made us all proud. In the past we could not lift our heads up. Now we can". He promised to give to Egypt a quality of aid worth $200 million US dollars to assist with the war effort, and stated he was willing to use the "oil weapon" if necessary to support Egypt.

The war began during the height of the Watergate scandal; as such Nixon largely let Kissinger manage foreign policy as he, Nixon, was distracted by the scandal. Kissinger promised Israeli Prime Minister Golda Meir that the United States would replace its losses in equipment after the war. However, he sought initially to delay arm shipments to Israel as he believed it would improve the odds of making peace along the lines of United Nations Security Council Resolution 242 calling for a "land for peace" deal if an armistice was signed with Egypt and Syria gaining some territory in the Sinai and the Golan Heights respectively.

Nixon had ordered an arms lift to Israel on 12 October 1973, but Kissinger used the excuse of bureaucratic delays to limit the amount of weapons and ammunition sent to Israel. The Arab concept of the "peace of the brave", i.e. a victorious leader being magnanimous to his defeated opponents, meant there was a possibility that Sadat at least would make peace with Israel provided that the war ended in such a way that Egypt was not perceived to be defeated. Likewise, Kissinger regarded Meir as being rather arrogant and believed that an armistice that ended the war in a manner that was not an unambiguous Israeli victory would make her more humble.

=== Cold War concerns ===
As both Syria and Egypt lost much equipment during the fighting, the Soviet Union began to fly new equipment in, starting on 12 October. Soviet flights to Syria and Egypt were recorded by the British radar stations in Cyprus. Though the Soviets were flying in an average of 60 flights per day, exaggerated accounts appeared in Western newspapers speaking of "one hundred flights per day".

At this point, both Nixon and Kissinger began to see the October War more in terms of the Cold War rather than Middle Eastern politics, both seeing the Soviet arms lifts to Egypt and Syria as a Soviet power play that required an American answer. On October 12, 1973, US president Richard Nixon authorized Operation Nickel Grass, a strategic airlift to deliver weapons and supplies to Israel in order to replace its materiel losses.

The first American weapons to Israel arrived on 15 October 1973, and despite Nixon's orders the number of American planes flying into Tel Aviv were initially limited. After the first week of the war, the Israelis had halted the Syrian offensive in the Golan Heights and were pushing back the Syrians back towards Damascus. Along the Suez canal, however, there was heavy fighting, with the Egyptians holding their own.

=== October OPEC summit and price increase ===
At an OPEC summit at the Sheraton Hotel in Kuwait City on 16 October 1973, it was announced the price of oil would go from $3.01 US dollars per barrel to $5.12 per barrel. The news about the war on 16 October was grim from the Arab viewpoint, with the Syrians steadily being pushed back, while Israelis had opened a counter-offensive against the Egyptians and crossed the Great Bitter Lake.

Responses from stated representatives at the meeting were varied. Saudi Oil Minister Ahmed Zaki Yamani stated, in a 1981 interview, that "[t]he king still wanted to give America a chance to stay out of the fighting. So we agreed to cut back production by just 5 percent per month. A full embargo, we agreed, was something we would implement only if we felt that things were absolutely hopeless". The Iranian delegation left the summit after agreeing to the price increase, as the Shah of Iran only supported higher oil prices.

The Oil Minister of Iraq, Sa'dun Hammadi demanded the "total nationalization" of all assets of American oil companies in the Middle East, the withdrawal of all Arab funds from the United States and for all Arab states to break diplomatic relations with the United States. The Libyan Oil Minister, Izz al-Din al-Mabruk, called for the nationalization of all the assets of all Western oil companies in the Middle East.

The Saudi delegation led by Yemani, supported by the Algerian delegation, fought hard against the Iraqi and Libyan demands for an embargo, as Yemani maintained that forcing through an increase in the price of oil was the best way to influence the United States. Hammadi and the rest of the Iraqi delegation left upset as Yemani had won over the majority of the delegations to the Saudi viewpoint. The statement issued after midnight at the Sheraton Hotel was handwritten and, reflecting the tense talk, had several paragraphs crossed out while other paragraphs were written in by different hands.

On 17 October, Arab oil producers cut production by 5% and threatened an oil embargo against Israel's wartime allies: the United States, the Netherlands, Rhodesia, South Africa, and Portugal.

=== American arms lift ===
On 17–19 October 1973, the Saudi Foreign Minister, Omar Al Saqqaf, visited Washington together with the foreign ministers of Algeria, Kuwait and Morocco to warn that there was a real possibility of an oil embargo being imposed. Nixon promised him that the United States would mediate a settlement to the war that would be "peaceful, just and honorable" to both sides. He had ended the Vietnam war on what he felt was an honorable basis and now intended to end the October war in the same manner. Saqqaf complained to King Faisal that Nixon seemed more interested in a dispute about "a burglary" (i.e. the Watergate scandal) than about the war. During a press conference, an American reporter mocked the threat of an embargo, contemptuously saying the Saudis "could drink their oil", leading Saqqaf to reply in anger "All right, we will!".

Israel took heavy losses in men and materiel during the fighting against Egypt and Syria, and on 18 October 1973, Meir requested $850 million worth of American arms and equipment to replace its materiel losses. Nixon decided, characteristically, to act on an epic scale; Instead of the $850 million worth of arms requested, he sent a request to Congress for some $2.2 billion worth of arms to Israel, which was promptly approved. Nixon, whose administration was being badly battered by the Watergate scandal, felt that a bold foreign policy move might resuscitate his administration.

Nixon later boasted in his memoirs that the US Air Force flew more sorties to Israel in October 1973 than it had during the Berlin Airlift of 1948–49, flying in a gargantuan quantity of arms, though he also admitted that by the time the arms lift had begun, the Israelis had already "turned the tide of battle" in their favor, making the arms lift irrelevant to the outcome of the war. In an interview with the British historian Robert Lacey in 1981, Kissinger later admitted about the arms lift to Israel: "I made a mistake. In retrospect it was not the best considered decision we made".

=== Embargo ===
The arms lift enraged King Faisal of Saudi Arabia. Faisal was angry that Israel had only asked for $850 million worth of American weapons, and instead received an unsolicited $2.2 billion worth of weapons, which he perceived as a sign of the pro-Israeli slant of American foreign policy. Faisal also felt insulted that Nixon had just promised Saqqaf an "honorable" peace the day before he submitted the request to Congress for some $2.2 billion worth of arms for Israel, which he saw as an act of duplicity on Nixon's part. Faisal had been opposed to a total embargo and only agreed to the 5% cut on 17 October under pressure from other Arab states. Faisal felt his efforts on behalf the United States were not being appreciated in Washington, which increased his fury at Nixon.

On the afternoon of 19 October 1973, Faisal was in his office when he learned about the United States sending $2.2 billion worth of weapons to Israel, and discussed the issue with two of his closest advisers, Abdullah ibn Abdul Rahman and Rashad Pharaon. The king called Yamani at about 8 pm, and told him he was needed at the Riyassa Palace immediately. Yamani told the king: "The TV news goes out at nine. If you make a decision now, we can get it announced at once". The king replied "Write this down" and announced he was placing a total embargo on the United States. Most of the other oil-producing Arab states joined the embargo. Algeria, Iraq, and Libya promoted the embargo, but did not actively enforce it.

The embargo was accompanied by gradual monthly production cuts—by December, production had been cut to 25% of September levels. This contributed to a global recession and increased tension between the United States and several of its European allies, who faulted the US for provoking an embargo by providing what many viewed as unconditional assistance to Israel. OAPEC demanded a complete Israeli withdrawal from all territories beyond the 1949 Armistice border.

The embargo lasted from October 1973 to March 1974.

=== Immediate effects ===
Because every Arab state except for Iraq and Libya joined the oil embargo, oil exports from the Middle East to the West were down by 60–70% by November 1973. Japan and the nations of western Europe imported some 75% of their oil from the Near East. The embargo led to immediate and sharp price raises, as Lacey noted that "competing desperately for dwindling supplies, consumers showed themselves willing to pay unparalleled money for their oil".

Saudi Arabia had 25% of the world's oil reserves. The embargo imposed on the United States led to shortages of oil in the United States, which set an inflationary spiral, as the new high prices for oil in the American market led to sharp increases of the price of oil in nations not subjected to the embargo. When the Iranian state oil company held an auction on 16 December 1973, bids for some $17 US dollars per barrel of oil were made.

In late December 1973, OPEC held a conference in Vienna when it was announced the price for a barrel of oil was to increase from $5 US dollars per barrel to $11.65 US dollars per barrel. Faisal was opposed to the price increase, which was largely the work of the Iranian delegation.

On 22 February 1974, King Faisal chaired the second summit of Islamic states in Lahore, which, unlike the first summit that Faisal had chaired in 1969, was not boycotted by Iraq and Syria. Faisal was acclaimed as a conquering hero who humiliated and humbled the West by wrecking its economy. The prime minister of Pakistan, Zulfikar Ali Bhutto, opened the conference by stating: "The armies of Pakistan are the armies of Islam. We shall enter Jerusalem as brothers-in-arms!"

=== Attempts at resolution ===
On November 7, 1973, Kissinger flew to Riyadh to meet King Faisal and ask him to end the oil embargo in exchange for promising to be "evenhanded" with the Arab-Israeli dispute. As the plane carrying him prepared to land in Riyadh, Kissinger was clearly nervous at the prospect of negotiating with the stern Wahhabi Faisal who had a marked dislike of Jews. During a summit in Cairo the day before, Kissinger asked Sadat what Faisal was like and was told: "Well, Dr. Henry, he will probably go on with you about Communism and the Jews".

King Faisal's two great hatreds were communism and Zionism, as he believed that the Soviet Union and Israel were plotting together against Islam. When King Faisal was shown a translation into Arabic of The Protocols of the Learned Elders of Zion, he instantly believed in the authenticity of The Protocols and therefore talked to anyone who would listen about what he had learned, despite the fact that The Protocols had been exposed as a forgery in 1921.

Kissinger discovered that King Faisal was a worthy companion to Lê Đức Thọ in terms of stubbornness; the king accused the United States of being biased in favor of Israel, going on in a long rant about the balefulness of "Jewish Communists" in Russia and Israel, and despite all of Kissinger's efforts to charm him, refused to end the oil embargo. Instead, Faisal told Kissinger:

The United States used to stand up to aggression—you did that in World War Two and in 1956 during the Suez War. If the United States had done the same after 1967, we would not have witnessed this deterioration... Before the Jewish State was established, there existed nothing to harm good relations between Arabs and Jews. There were many Jews in Arab countries. When the Jews were persecuted in Spain, Arabs protected them. When the Romans drove the Jews out, Arabs protected them. At Yalta, it was Stalin who said there had to be a Jewish state...Israel is advancing Communist objectives...Among those of the Jewish faith there are those who embrace Zionism...Most of the immigration to Israel is from the Soviet Union...They want to establish a Communist base right in the Middle East...And now, all over the world, the Jews are putting themselves into positions of authority".

Initially, Secretary of Defense James Schlesinger suggested to Kissinger that the United States invade Saudi Arabia and another Arab countries and seize their oil fields. Kissinger stated in a private state department meeting that it is "ridiculous that the civilized world is held up by 8 million savages... Can't we overthrow one of the sheikhs just to show that we can do it?" They formed a plan to invade Abu Dhabi, Kuwait, and Saudi Arabia. Kissinger publicly threatened "countermeasures" in a November 21, 1973 press conference if the embargo was not lifted, and the Saudis responded with threatening further oil cuts and to burn their oil fields if the US military invaded. After the CIA confirmed these threats, Kissinger gave up military intervention and decided to deal with Israel's troop withdrawals, settling on diplomatic solutions to the oil embargo.

=== Lifting the embargo ===
On 18 March 1974, King Faisal ended the oil embargo.

Sadat had reported to Faisal that the United States was being more "evenhanded", and Kissinger had promised to sell Saudi Arabia weapons that it had previously denied under the grounds that they might be used against Israel. More importantly, Saudi Arabia had billions of dollars invested in Western banks, and the massive bout of inflation set off by the oil embargo was a threat to this fortune as inflation eroded the value of the money, giving Faisal a vested interest in helping to contain the damage he himself had inflicted on the economies of the West.

=== Effectiveness of the embargo ===
Since Israeli forces did not withdraw to the 1949 Armistice Line, the majority of scholars believe that the embargo was a failure. Roy Licklider, in his 1988 book Political Power and the Arab Oil Weapon, concluded that the embargo was a failure because the countries that were targeted by the embargo did not change their policies on the Arab–Israeli conflict. Licklider believed that any long term changes were caused by the OPEC increase in the posted price of oil, and not the OAPEC embargo. Daniel Yergin, on the other hand, has said that the embargo "remade the international economy". Robert Lacey wrote:

King Faisal's momentous oil embargo of 20 October 1973 did not achieve a single one of its stated objectives. The ceasefire which the USA and the USSR together imposed two days later upon Israel, Syria and Egypt would have been imposed in any case; Israel ended the October war, thanks to US aid, better equipped militarily than she had ever been before, and Faisal's ambition to shrink Israel back inside her pre-1949 boundaries remains unfulfilled to this day. Nor did the withholding of the 638,500 barrels of oil that Saudi Arabia had been selling to the United States daily during the first 10 months of 1973 ever, by itself, jeopardize American power or alter its policies, as it made up less than 4 percent of the country's daily consumption of 17 million barrels. It was the interaction which Faisal's embargo had with other forces that made it so decisive. Arab politics had an immediate multiplier effect.

Over the long term, the oil embargo changed the nature of policy in the West towards increased exploration, alternative energy research, energy conservation and more restrictive monetary policy to better fight inflation.

== Chronology ==
For further details see the "Energy crisis" series by Facts on File.

- January 1973 – The 1973–1974 stock market crash commences as a result of inflation pressure and the collapsing monetary system.
- August 23, 1973 – In preparation for the Yom Kippur War, Saudi king Faisal and Egyptian president Anwar Sadat meet in Riyadh and secretly negotiate an accord whereby the Arabs will use the "oil weapon" as part of the military conflict.
- October 6 – Egypt and Syria attack Israeli positions on Yom Kippur, starting the 1973 Arab–Israeli War.
- Night of October 8 – Israel goes on full nuclear alert. Kissinger is notified on the morning of October 9. United States begins to resupply Israel.
- October 8–10 – OPEC negotiations with major oil companies to revise the 1971 Tehran price agreement fail.
- October 12 – The United States initiates Operation Nickel Grass, a strategic airlift to provide replacement weapons and supplies to Israel. This followed similar Soviet moves to supply the Arab side.
- October 16 – Saudi Arabia, Iran, Iraq, Abu Dhabi, Kuwait and Qatar raise posted prices by 17% to $3.65 per barrel and announce production cuts.
- October 17 – OAPEC oil ministers agree to use oil to influence the West's support of Israel. They recommended an embargo against non-complying states and mandated export cuts.
- October 19 – Nixon requests Congress to appropriate $2.2 billion in emergency aid to Israel, which triggers a collective Arab response. Libya immediately proclaims an embargo on oil exports to the US. Saudi Arabia and other Arab oil-producing states follow the next day.
- October 26 – The Yom Kippur War ends.
- November 5 – Arab producers announce a 25% output cut. A further 5% cut is threatened.
- November 23 – The Arab embargo is extended to Portugal, Rhodesia and South Africa.
- November 27 – Nixon signs the Emergency Petroleum Allocation Act authorizing price, production, allocation and marketing controls.
- December 9 – Arab oil ministers agree to another five percent production cut for non-friendly countries in January 1974.
- December 25 – Arab oil ministers cancel the January output cut. Saudi oil minister Ahmed Zaki Yamani promises a ten percent OPEC production rise.
- January 7–9, 1974 – OPEC decides to freeze prices until April 1.
- January 18 – Israel signs a withdrawal agreement to pull back to the east side of the Suez Canal.
- February 11 – Kissinger unveils the Project Independence plan for US energy independence.
- February 12–14 – Progress in Arab-Israeli disengagement triggers discussion of oil strategy among the heads of state of Algeria, Egypt, Syria and Saudi Arabia.
- March 5 – Israel withdraws the last of its troops from the west side of the Suez Canal.
- March 17 – Arab oil ministers, with the exception of Libya, announce the end of the US embargo.
- May 31 – Diplomacy by Kissinger produces a disengagement agreement on the Syrian front.
- December 1974 – The US stock market recovers.

== Effects ==
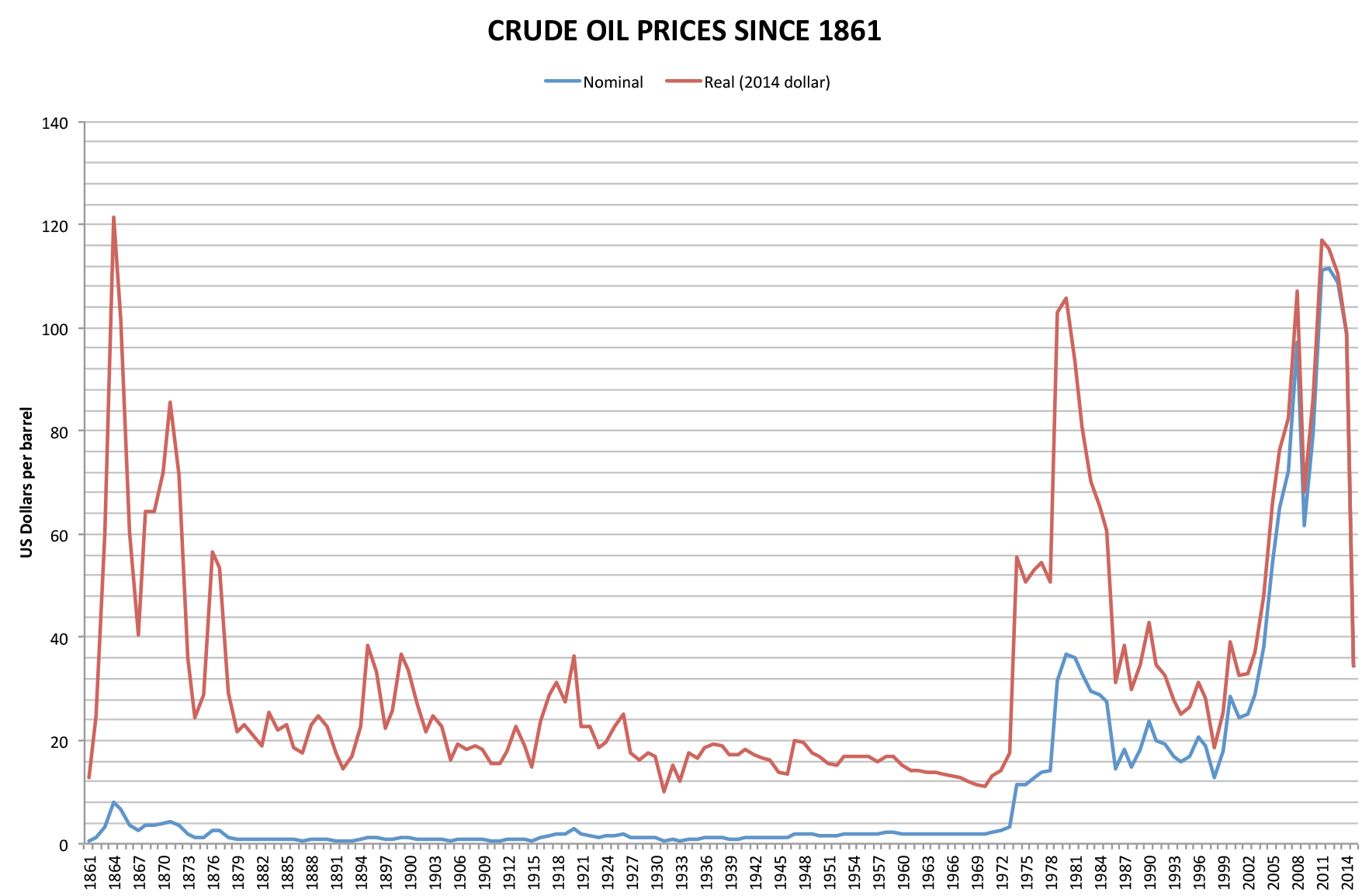
Oil prices in USD, 1861–2015. Measured are 1861–1944 averaged US crude oil, 1945–1983 Arabian Light, and 1984–2015 Brent. Red line adjusted for inflation, blue not adjusted.

The effects of the embargo were immediate. OPEC forced oil companies to increase payments drastically. The price of oil quadrupled by 1974 from US$3 to nearly US$12 per 42 gallon barrel ($75 per cubic meter), equivalent in 2018 dollars to a price rise from $17 to $61 per barrel. Saudi Arabia had 25% of the world's oil, but only 4% of the oil used in the United States in 1973 came from the kingdom. However, Saudi Arabia plays an over-sized role within the Arab world. As a Beirut oil consultant noted in 1974: "If Saudi Arabia moves from A to B, then every other oil producer must move at least as far, if not to C."

In 1973, about 25% of the oil used in the United States came from Arab countries. The shortage of oil within the United States caused by the Arab oil embargo forced prices to rise, which led price rises globally. Oil producers that had not joined the embargo such as Iran, Venezuela, Libya and Iraq demanded higher prices in Japan and Europe, as an initiative to ship oil to those places instead of the United States, setting off a worldwide inflationary spiral.

The only European nations subject to the oil embargo were the Netherlands (because the Dutch Foreign Minister Max van der Stoel was strongly pro-Israeli) and Portugal (in a show of support for the independence movements in Portugal's African colonies), but the shortage of oil in the United States led to sharp price rises in all of the European nations. Although the embargo did not severely disrupt US oil supplies—since Americans imported more oil from non-embargoed nations such as Iran—the resulting 400% increase in oil prices caused by the embargo damaged the American economy.

A number of nations such as Venezuela, Nigeria, Iran and Iraq increased their oil production during the embargo, and sold their oil at a higher price. The leader who pushed the most for higher oil prices was the Shah of Iran, and the Italian historian Giuliano Garavini has argued that the leader most responsible for the West's economic problems during the "oil shock" was not King Faisal, but rather the Shah. Some of the nations that were classified as "friendly" to the Arab viewpoint in regards to the Arab-Israeli dispute such as France and Belgium were the ones who suffered the most from the worldwide inflation caused by the embargo.

In March 1974, the crisis eased when the embargo was lifted after negotiations at the Washington Oil Summit, but the effects lingered throughout the 1970s. The dollar price of energy increased again in 1975, amid the weakening competitive position of the dollar in world markets.

The Arab oil embargo ended the long period of prosperity in the West that had begun in 1945, throwing the world's economy into the steepest economic contraction since the Great Depression. The "long summer" of prosperity in the post-war years had made possible the "swinging sixties" and the related rise of a rebellious youth culture, as it was easy to be hedonist or in rebellion against traditional values in a time of unprecedented prosperity. Lacey wrote that for people in the West, life suddenly become "slower, darker and chiller" as gasoline was rationed, the lights were turned off in Times Square, the "gas guzzler" automobiles suddenly stopped selling, speed limits became common, and restrictions were placed on weekend driving in a bid to conserve fuel.

As the American automobile industry specialized in producing heavy "gas guzzler" vehicles, there was an immediate shift on the part of consumers to the lighter and more fuel-efficient vehicles produced by the Japanese and West German automobile industries, sending the American automobile industry into decline. 1945 to 1973 had been a period of unprecedented prosperity in the West, a "long summer" that many believed would never end. Its abrupt end in 1973, as the oil embargo increased the price of oil by 400% within a matter of days and threw the world's economy into a sharp recession, with unemployment mounting and inflation raging, came as a profound shock.

The end of what the French called the Trente Glorieuses ("Glorious Thirty" [years]) led to widespread pessimism in the West, with the Financial Times running a famous headline in late 1973 saying, "The Future will be subject to Delay". In an August 1974 address to the General Assembly, Kurt Waldheim, the secretary-general of the United Nations, complained about "the note of helplessness and fatalism creeping into world affairs". The sudden and abrupt end of the "long summer" of prosperity in 1973-1974 played a major role in the pessimistic mood that characterized the culture of the West of the 1970s. In 1975, a report to Congress from the Federal Energy Administration estimated that the embargo of 1973–1974 had caused about 500,000 Americans to lose their jobs, and caused a GNP loss between $10 billion–$20 billion.

=== Impact on oil exporting nations ===
An American in January 1974 at a service station reads about the gasoline rationing system in an afternoon newspaper. A sign in the background states that no gasoline is available.

This price increase had a dramatic effect on oil exporting nations, for the countries of the Middle East who had long been dominated by the industrial powers were seen to have taken control of a vital commodity. The oil-exporting nations began to accumulate vast wealth.

Some of the income was dispensed in the form of aid to other underdeveloped nations whose economies had been caught between higher oil prices and lower prices for their own export commodities, amid shrinking Western demand. Much went for arms purchases that exacerbated political tensions, particularly in the Middle East. Saudi Arabia spent over 100 billion dollars in the ensuing decades for helping spread its fundamentalist interpretation of Islam, known as Wahhabism, throughout the world, via religious charities such as the al-Haramain Foundation, which often also distributed funds to violent Sunni extremist groups such as Al-Qaeda and the Taliban.

The 400% increase in the world oil prices led to extravagant promises being made by the leaders of oil-producing nations. The Shah of Iran told his subjects in a speech in December 1973 that he was launching "Great Civilization" project that would make Iran into a First World nation by the 1990s. President Carlos Andrés Pérez of Venezuela likewise launched his Le Gran Venezuela project intended to make Venezuela into a First World nation. President Yakubu Gowon of Nigeria told his people that henceforward Nigeria's main problem would be "managing abundance".

After the oil shock, Nigeria presented itself as the first African nation that would reach First World status. In Lagos, a series of stately modernist buildings were erected as appropriate for a nation that saw itself as the leader of all Black Africa. Much of the oil wealth in Nigeria was stolen by corrupt politicians. At least some of Nigeria's new oil wealth went to rebuild the areas devastated by the civil war of 1967-1970 and to address the complaints that too much of Nigeria's oil wealth went to the federal government in Lagos instead of the people.

In Iran, the Shah who was aware by 1974 that he had developed the cancer that was to ultimately kill him in 1980, pushed very strongly for his "Great Civilization" for rapid modernization, not the least because he wanted to see the "Great Civilization" before his death, which explained his grandiose announcements. The new wealth generated by the "oil shock" allowed for Chairman Houari Boumédiène of Algeria to become a global leader, courted by elites in the First World and the Third World.

The oil embargo led a sudden interest in the Palestinian issue. Between 1973 and 1981, Saudi Arabia donated a sum worth $1 billion US dollars to the Palestine Liberation Organization, which thus had a budget that exceeded that of many Third World nations. On November 8, 1973, Kissinger became the first Secretary of State to meet with a Saudi leader since 1953, as he met King Faisal to ask him to end the embargo. Within two week of the embargo being launched, all of the foreign ministers of the nations of the European Economic Community, now the European Union, met in a conference to issue a statement calling for Israel "to end the territorial occupation which has maintained since the conflict of 1967".

On December 11, 1973, the Japanese Foreign Minister Masayoshi Ōhira flew in to Riyadh to meet King Faisal for "talks on improving bilateral relations". Shortly afterwards, the French foreign minister Michel Jobert arrived to sign an agreement that provided oil for France for the next twenty years. On January 24, 1974, as the Shah of Iran, Mohammad Reza Pahlavi, was coming off the ski slopes of St. Moritz, he was met by the British Chancellor of Exchequer, Anthony Barber, and the Trade Secretary, Peter Walker. In a role-reversal, Barber and Walker paid homage to the Shah, who promised them that his nation would sell the United Kingdom 5 million tons of oil in exchange for some £100 million of British goods, to aid his plans to industrialize Iran.

Saudi Arabia experienced an upsurge of prosperity and affluence after the oil embargo, whose consequences horrified King Faisal. Faisal, who was devoted to a harsh puritanical strain of Sunni Islam known in the West as Wahhabism, was appalled by the way that his subjects became materialistic, devoted only to conspicuous consumption and greed as they lost interest in Islam. Lacey wrote: "The spiritual dangers of easy affluence distressed him more. His simple gesture of piety and honor seemed to have opened a Pandora's Box that threatened to turn his realm into a parody of all he held dear". In the last two of years of his life, Faisal fell into depression over the way his subjects had been seduced into a consumerist lifestyle, becoming lost in a sense of "melancholia".

Faisal's son, Crown Prince Mohammad told Lacey in 1981: "The profligacy, the greed, he felt he could not stem it. He become so bound up in his work, there was almost nothing private of him left". A sign of the changed values was that despite the total ban on alcohol in Saudi Arabia, drinking and drug use became common with the younger members of the House of Saud. James Akins, the American ambassador in Riyadh reported; "the sky over Riyadh is black with vultures with new get-richer-quicker plans under their wings". In 1974, property prices in Riyadh doubled on a weekly basis for the entire year, as the prosperity led to a real estate speculation bubble that was often compared to the Klondike gold rush of 1898–1899.

At the Red Sea port of Jeddah, there were so many ships queuing up laden with cement for the construction boom in Saudi Arabia, that construction contractors hired helicopters to fly the cement in, twenty bags per flight. A number of families engaged in the Saudi construction industry such as the Juffali, Alireza, al-Khasshoggi and the bin Laden families all became very wealthy as a result of the construction boom. The period after the oil shock of 1973–1974 is still fondly remembered in Saudi Arabia as the "age of abundance", where nearly everyone had a significant increase in their standard of living.

The wealth and corruption generated by the oil shock led to a fundamentalist backlash in Saudi Arabia. On 20 November 1979, Islam's holiest shrine, the Grand Mosque of Mecca, was seized by a group who proclaimed themselves to be the followers of the Mahdi, a messianic figure said to appear at the dawn of every Muslim century to strike down the enemies of Islam. The leader of the uprising, Juhayman al-Otaybi, read out a list of grievances, as he accused the House of Saud of being corrupt and degenerate, listing by name a number of Saudi princes who were engaged in dubious business dealings and/or who drank alcohol. The Saudi Army recaptured the Grand Mosque, and the surviving "renegades", as the rebels were labelled, were executed.

Likewise, the perception that most of the wealth being generated by the now higher price of oil was being stolen by a corrupt Shah, along with the unfulfilled promises of the "Great Civilization" project, played a major role in causing the Iranian Revolution that toppled the Shah, and led to the establishment of the Islamic Republic of Iran in February 1979. In Algeria, the "oil shock" led to the establishment of a welfare state where none had existed previously. The lower oil prices of the 1980s along with cutbacks and the belief that the FLN regime was corrupt helped cause the riots of October 1988 against the FLN regime, that killed at least 500 people.

The riots were largely caused by the fact that the low oil prices had forced the Algerian state to end many of its more generous social policies between 1986 and 1988, leading to an unemployment rate of 30% by 1988, along with the knowledge that the FLN regime had stolen millions. In the aftermath of the October riots, President Chadli Bendjedid began a transition to democracy. The first free elections in Algeria in January 1992 were won by the Islamist FIS, which led to a military coup and an outbreak of a civil war that killed hundreds of thousands of Algerians.

OPEC-member states raised the prospect of nationalization of oil company holdings. Most notably, Saudi Arabia nationalized Aramco in 1980 under the leadership of Saudi oil minister Ahmed Zaki Yamani. As other OPEC nations followed suit, the cartel's income soared. Saudi Arabia undertook a series of ambitious five-year development plans. The biggest began in 1980, funded at $250 billion. Other cartel members also undertook major economic development programs.

=== Oil weapon ===
Control of oil became known as the "oil weapon". It came in the form of an embargo and production cutbacks from the Arab states. The weapon was aimed at the United States, Great Britain, Canada, Japan and the Netherlands. These target governments perceived that the intent was to push them towards a more pro-Arab position. Production was eventually cut by 25%. However, the affected countries did not undertake dramatic policy changes.

The risk that the Middle East could become another superpower confrontation with the USSR was of more concern to Washington than oil. Further, interest groups and government agencies more worried about energy were no match for Kissinger's dominance.

=== Impact on United States ===
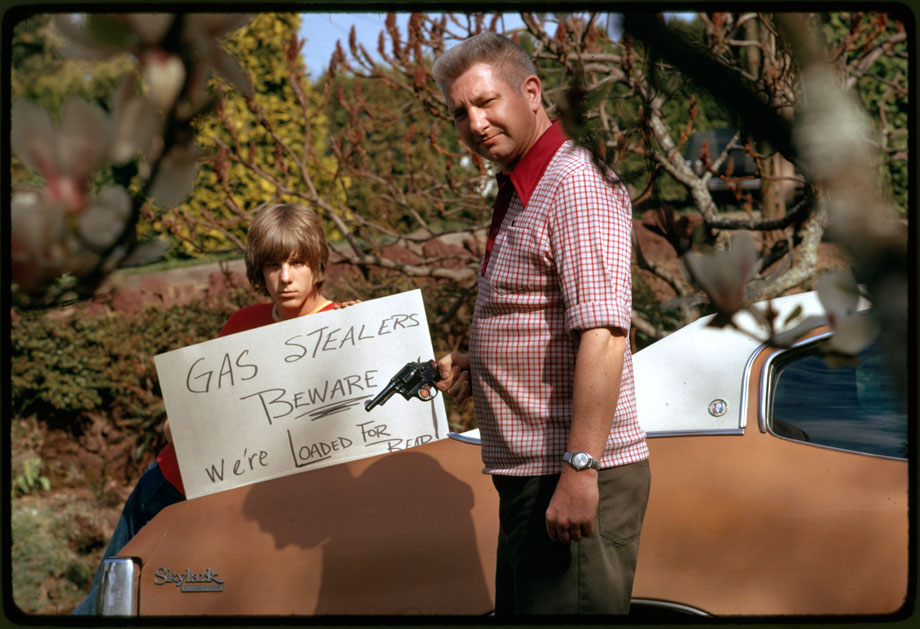
A father and son hold up their sign saying "Gas Stealers Beware, we're loaded for bear" during the Oil Crisis

In the US production, distribution and price disruptions "have been held responsible for recessions, periods of excessive inflation, reduced productivity, and lower economic growth." Some researchers regard the 1973 "oil price shock" and the accompanying 1973–74 stock market crash as the first discrete event since the Great Depression to have a persistent effect on the US economy.

The embargo had a negative influence on the US economy, causing immediate demands to address the threats to US energy security. On an international level, the price increases changed competitive positions in many industries, such as automobiles. Macroeconomic problems consisted of both inflationary and deflationary impacts. The embargo left oil companies searching for new ways to increase oil supplies, even in rugged terrain such as the Arctic. Finding oil and developing new fields usually required five to 10 years before significant production.

The average US retail price of a gallon of regular gasoline rose 43% from 38.5¢ in May 1973 to 55.1¢ in June 1974. State governments asked citizens not to put up Christmas lights. Oregon banned Christmas and commercial lighting altogether. Politicians called for a national gasoline rationing program. Nixon asked gasoline retailers to voluntarily not sell gasoline on Saturday nights or Sundays. 90% of gas station owners complied, which produced long lines of motorists wanting to fill up their cars while they still could.

The "oil shock" provided considerable impetus to the American nuclear industry as a way to achieve "energy independence" from the Middle East. On 7 November 1973, Nixon in an address to Congress called for Project Independence to make the United States self-sufficient in energy by 1980, which called for a massive investment in the nuclear industry. Nixon envisioned nuclear energy as more economical, and was encouraged by the enthusiasm of many officials who saw nuclear energy as the technology of the future.

By the late 1960s, a lively environmentalist movement had emerged in the United States, and the Project Independence nuclear program was the subject of much debate in both the media and Congress. The ensuing debates revealed that many of the claims made for nuclear power underestimated the true costs of nuclear reactors. Equally problematic was where to safety store the spent nuclear rods that emitted a toxic level of radioactivity for centuries afterward, in a cost-effective manner. The issue of the spent nuclear rods was especially difficult because of NIMBYism, where communities proved unwilling to accept a storage place for the inevitable by-product of nuclear power, the spent nuclear rods, with the demand that the government find some other community to store the rods.

Many of the nuclear reactors ordered in 1973 were cancelled due to cost overruns, while over 100 nuclear plants were shut down as uneconomical over the next 10 years. Unlike nations that tried to use nuclear power as a way for energy independence such as France and Sweden, the United States had substantial reserves of its own oil, which weakened the case for nuclear power in the ensuring debates. By 1989, only 18% of American energy came from nuclear power plants, which was a fraction of what Project Independence had envisioned in 1973.

The oil shock led to anti-Arab feelings becoming common. Cartoons published in American newspapers during the oil shock depicted Arabs as disgusting, ugly, obese, corrupt and greedy. In the cartoons, the long hooked Semitic noses that had traditionally been featured in anti-Jewish cartoons were applied to the Arab sheiks as a way to illustrate their supposed greed. American public opinion did not see the use of the "oil weapon" as due to politics, and tended to explain the embargo as only due to the excessive greed of King Faisal and the other Arab leaders, hence the use of the hooked Semitic nose in the cartoons as a sort of shorthand for insatiable greed.

=== Impact of the Soviet Union ===
The Soviet Union was not a beneficiary of the oil crisis. The crisis prompted the USSR to raise energy prices within the Council on Mutual Economic Assistance (CMEA). The inability of the USSR to meet energy demand from its allies led those "East European governments to purchase oil from Middle Eastern countries at increasing world market prices, crippling their balance of payments and accentuating their other economic shortcomings."

=== Impact on Western Europe ===
The embargo was not uniform across Western Europe. Of the nine members of the European Economic Community (EEC), the Netherlands faced a complete embargo. By contrast Britain and France received almost uninterrupted supplies. That was their reward for refusing to allow the US to use their airfields and stopping arms and supplies to both the Arabs and the Israelis. The other six EEC nations faced partial cutbacks. The UK had traditionally been an ally of Israel, and Harold Wilson's government supported the Israelis during the Six-Day War. His successor, Ted Heath, reversed this policy in 1970, calling for Israel to withdraw to its pre-1967 borders.

In 1969, France devalued the franc. The devalued franc made imports more expensive for French consumers, which encouraged them to buy French products, while making French products cheaper abroad. France was entirely dependent upon imported oil, through French companies continued to lease the oil concessions in Algeria until 1971. The low price of oil internationally compensated to a certain extent for the higher price of oil caused by the devaluation. The devalued franc ensured that the dramatic price increases caused by the oil shock hit the French economy especially hard in 1973.

The UK, Germany, Italy, Switzerland and Norway banned flying, driving and boating on Sundays. Sweden rationed gasoline and heating oil. The Netherlands imposed prison sentences for those who used more than their ration of electricity.

The EEC was unable to achieve a common policy during the first month of the embargo. It issued a statement on November 6, after the embargo and price rises had begun. It was widely viewed as pro-Arab, supporting the Franco-British line on the war. OPEC duly lifted its embargo from all EEC members. The other European states did not rally in defense of the Dutch who were left to fend for themselves and instead reached bilateral deals with Saudi Arabia, Iraq and Iran. Faced with a recession, there was a tendency within the EEC nations to turn inwards away from European integration.

The price rises had a much greater impact in Europe than the embargo. The crisis retarded the movement towards European economic integration which had been gathering pace ever since the EEC, now the European Union, had been founded in 1957. In 1973, the German historian Jens-Uwe Wunderlich wrote that attempts to finish off the European common market came to a "complete standstill" in 1973 and it was not until 1977 that movement towards creating the common market resumed.

As the EEC's customs union had made it impossible to raise tariffs against other EEC members, there was a tendency, especially pronounced in France and the United Kingdom, for governments to subside national champions with selected corporations receiving grants and tax breaks as a response to the crisis. In particular, the oil shock increased the appeal of nuclear energy as a way to achieve energy independence from the turbulent Middle East. Starting in March 1974 with the "Energy Plan" introduced by the premier Pierre Messmer, the French state made a massive investment in nuclear energy. By the 1990s, 80% of all of France's energy came from nuclear plants.

==== Impact on United Kingdom ====
The North Sea oil fields, which were discovered in 1969, did not start to be exploited until 1975, making the United Kingdom entirely dependent upon imported oil in 1973. The way that world oil prices quadrupled in late 1973 had a very adverse impact on the British economy,. In a series of speeches in December 1973, the Prime Minister Edward Heath warned that because of the oil shock that the British economy was going into recession and the British people should expect economic austerity. The need to avoid importing the now more expensive oil to help manage the balance-of-payments led the Heath government to turn towards coal, which Britain was self-sufficient in, as a substitute source of energy, which gave the coal miners union immense leverage over the government to press for higher wages for the coal miners.

Heath offered the coal miners a 7% wage increase, which was rejected as insufficient by the miners who went on strike. Through not subjected to the embargo, the UK faced an energy crisis of its own—a series of strikes by coal miners and railroad workers over the winter of 1973–74 became a major factor in the defeat of Heath's Conservative government in the February 1974 general elections. The new Labour government told the British to heat only one room in their houses over the winter. The Labour government of Harold Wilson settled the strike by giving the coal miners a 35% pay increase.

=== Impact on Japan ===
Japan was hard hit, since it imported 90% of its oil from the Middle East. It had a stockpile good for 55 days, and another 20-day supply was en route. Facing its most serious crisis since 1945, the government ordered a 10% cut in the consumption of industrial oil and electricity. In December 1973, it ordered an immediate 20% cut in oil use and electric power to Japan's major industries, and cutbacks in leisure automobile usage. Economist predicted the growth rate would plunge from 5% annually, down to zero or even negative territory. Inflation hit 9%.

Seeking to take advantage of the crisis, Japanese business called on the government to relax its controls on air pollution and water pollution. The government refused. Moscow tried to take advantage by promising energy assistance if Japan renounced its claim to the Kurile Islands. Tokyo refused. Instead it made $3.3 billion of dollars in loans to the Arab states and called on Israel to step back.

Japan's defensive strategy was explained to Kissinger when he met with top leaders in Tokyo in November 1973. In the long run Japan never wavered in its determination to maintain very strong close ties to the United States, while in self-defense briefly providing the Arab powers with the rhetoric they demanded in return for resuming oil shipments in early 1974.

To assure future oil flows, Japan added suppliers outside of the Middle East, invested in nuclear power, imposed conservation measures, and provided funding for Arab governments and the Palestinians. The crisis was a major factor in the long-run shift of Japan's economy away from oil-intensive industries. Investment shifted to electronics. Japanese auto makers benefited from the crisis. The jump in gasoline prices helped their small, fuel-efficient models to gain market share from the "gas-guzzling" Detroit competition. This triggered a drop in US sales of American cars that lasted into the 1980s.

=== Impact on India ===
The oil crisis contributed to the poor state of the Indian economy and played a role in Indira Gandhi's decision to impose The Emergency, a dictatorship. The state led a push for coal as an energy source, even though there were reservations about its adverse environmental effects.

=== Impact on South Vietnam ===
The oil shock destroyed the economy of South Vietnam. A spokesman for President Nguyễn Văn Thiệu admitted in a TV interview that the government was being "overwhelmed" by the inflation caused by the oil shock. An American businessman living in Saigon stated after the oil shock, that attempting to make money in South Vietnam was "like making love to a corpse". In December 1973, Vietcong sappers attacked and destroyed the petroleum depot of Nha Be, further depleting fuel sources.

By the summer of 1974, the US embassy in Saigon reported that morale in the ARVN (Army of the Republic of Vietnam) had fallen to dangerously low levels and it was uncertain how much more longer South Vietnam would last. As inflation eroded the value of the South Vietnamese đồng, it became common by the summer of 1974 to see ARVN soldiers and their families begging in the streets for food.

In December 1974, the North Vietnamese PAVN (People's Army of Vietnam) launched an offensive in the Central Highlands that was far more successful than expected, due to the ARVN's low morale and weak resistance. On March 1, 1975, the PAVN launched a major offensive that quickly overran the Central Highlands. By March 25, 1975, Hue had fallen. Following their victory in the Central Highlands, the North Vietnamese launched the "Ho Chi Minh Campaign" that captured Saigon on April 30, 1975.

=== Impact on southern Africa ===
Three of the nations targeted by the embargo were located in southern Africa or had colonies there. Portugal which ruled the colonies of Angola, Portuguese Guiana (modern Guinea-Bissau), and Portuguese East Africa (modern Mozambique) had fighting colonial wars in all of its African colonies since the 1960s with Angola being the first to rise up in 1961. Angola is rich in oil, which protected Portugal from the worse of the embargo. But the economic stability of the Estado Novo regime was damaged by the worldwide inflation, which help cause the Carnation Revolution which toppled the Estado Novo regime in April 1974 and led to the restoration of democracy. Portugal granted independence to all of its colonies except for Macau in 1975.

The British historian Rob Skinner wrote the embargo had a "significant impact" on the South African economy. The inflationary rise in commodity prices increased the input costs of South African manufacturing, making South African manufactured goods uncompetitive on the world market. The rise in the price of gold as a hedge against inflation (South Africa has the world's largest gold mines) caused the rand to increase in value, which caused further problems for South African manufacturing.

The strategy pursued by the National Party government since 1948 of sponsoring the industrialization of South Africa was derailed by the oil shock, with what Skinner described as "important social and political consequences" for the apartheid regime. The Soweto uprising of 1976 was at least in part caused by anger at the high unemployment rate in the black South African community.

Even worse hit than South Africa was Rhodesia (modern Zimbabwe), where oil was already expensive as the white supremacist government of Rhodesia had been under United Nations sanctions since 1965, and thus the smugglers who sold Rhodesia oil charged a premium for their services. The premium charged by the "sanctions busters" such as Iran increased after the embargo, which threw the Rhodesian economy into recession. Despite the United Nations sanctions, Rhodesia was a major exporter of chrome, steel and tobacco with the United States exempting "strategical" Rhodesian products such as chrome from the sanctions.

The global recession of 1973–1975 proved more effective than the United Nations in ending the global demand for Rhodesian products, which made the Rhodesian recession especially severe. Unlike South Africa, which had a sizable and long-standing white population, the white population of Rhodesia was much smaller and more recent. Rhodesia depended considerably more than South Africa on white immigration to provide enough soldiers for its army, while most of the Rhodesian whites had only arrived in the 1950s and did not have very deep roots in the country.

The white flight caused by the recession put the Rhodesian Army at a major disadvantage in its war against the black guerrillas. The war cost the Rhodesian government one million Rhodesian dollars per day by 1975, and the costs of the war threatened to bankrupt Rhodesia. In 1979, Rhodesia signed the Lancaster House Agreement, which led to Black majority rule in 1980.

=== Price controls and rationing ===
==== United States ====
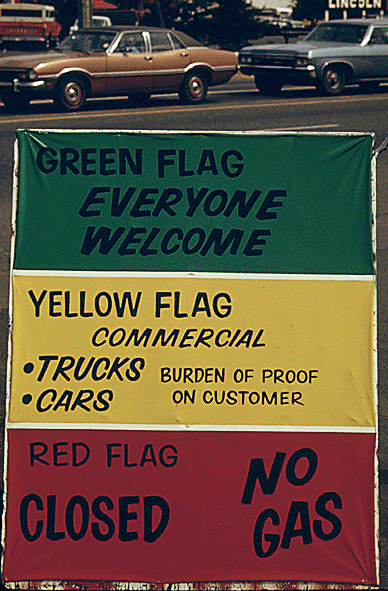
Oregon gasoline dealers displayed signs explaining the flag policy in the winter of 1973–74.

Price controls exacerbated the crisis in the US. The system limited the price of "old oil", that which had already been discovered, while allowing newly discovered oil to be sold at a higher price, to encourage investment. As a result, old oil was withdrawn from the market, creating greater scarcity. The rule also discouraged development of alternative energies. The rule had been intended to promote oil exploration.

Scarcity was addressed by rationing, as in many countries. Motorists faced long lines at gas stations beginning in summer 1972 and increasing by summer 1973. A sign of the change caused by the crisis was that in 1974 the Exxon oil company replaced the General Motors corporation to be the largest corporation in the world, as measured by gross sales revenues.

In 1973, Nixon named William E. Simon as the first Administrator of the Federal Energy Office, a short-term organization created to coordinate the response to the embargo. Simon allocated states the same amount of domestic oil for 1974 that each had consumed in 1972, which worked for states whose populations were not increasing. In other states, lines at gasoline stations were common. The American Automobile Association reported that in the last week of February 1974, 20% of American gasoline stations had no fuel.

Odd–even rationing allowed vehicles with license plates having an odd number as the last digit, or a vanity license plate, to buy gas only on odd-numbered days of the month. Others could buy only on even-numbered days.

In some states, a three-color flag system was used to denote gasoline availability at service stations—green for unrationed availability, yellow for restricted/rationed sales, and red for out of stock.

Gasoline ration stamps printed by the Bureau of Engraving and Printing in 1974, but not used

Rationing led to violent incidents, when truck drivers chose to strike for two days in December 1973 over the limited supplies that Simon had allocated for their industry. In Pennsylvania and Ohio, non-striking truckers were shot at by striking truckers. In Arkansas, trucks of non-strikers were attacked with bombs.

America had controlled the price of natural gas since the 1950s. With the inflation of the 1970s, the price was too low to encourage the search for new reserves. America's natural gas reserves dwindled from 237 trillion in 1974 to 203 trillion in 1978. The price controls were not changed, despite president Gerald Ford's repeated requests to Congress.

=== Conservation and reduction in demand ===
==== United States ====
To help reduce consumption, in 1974 a national maximum speed limit of 55 mph (89 km/h) was imposed through the Emergency Highway Energy Conservation Act. Development of the Strategic Petroleum Reserve began in 1975, and in 1977 the cabinet-level Department of Energy was created, followed by the National Energy Act of 1978.

In November 1995, President Bill Clinton signed the National Highway Designation Act, ending the federal 55 mph speed limit, which allowed states to restore their prior maximum speed limit. Year-round daylight saving time was implemented from January 6, 1974, to October 27, 1975, with a break between October 27, 1974, and February 23, 1975, when the country observed standard time. Parents complained that it forced many children to travel to school before sunrise. The prior rules were restored in 1976.

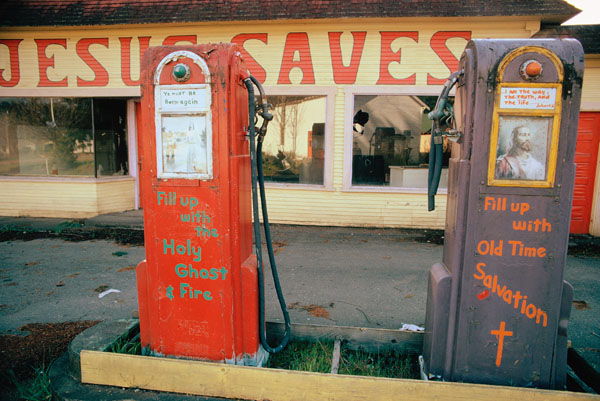
Gas stations abandoned during the crisis were sometimes used for other purposes. This station at Potlatch, Washington, was turned into a revival hall.

The crisis prompted a call to conserve energy, most notably a campaign by the Advertising Council using the tagline "Don't Be Fuelish". Many newspapers carried advertisements featuring cut-outs that could be attached to light switches, reading "Last Out, Lights Out: Don't Be Fuelish".

Although not regulated by the new legislation, auto racing groups voluntarily began conserving. In 1974, NASCAR reduced all race distances by 10%; the 24 Hours of Daytona and the 12 Hours of Sebring race were cancelled.

In 1975, the Energy Policy and Conservation Act was passed, leading to the creation of the Corporate Average Fuel Economy (CAFE) standards that required improved fuel economy for cars and light trucks.

In 1976, Congress created the Weatherization Assistance Program to help low-income homeowners and renters reduce their demand for heating and cooling through better insulation.

By 1980, domestic luxury cars with a 130-inch (3.3 m) wheelbase and gross weights averaging 4,500 pounds (2,041 kg) were no longer made. The automakers had begun phasing out the traditional front engine/rear-wheel drive layout in compact cars in favor of lighter front engine/front-wheel drive designs. A higher percentage of cars offered more efficient four-cylinder engines. Domestic auto makers also began offering more fuel efficient diesel powered passenger cars as well.

=== Alternative energy sources ===
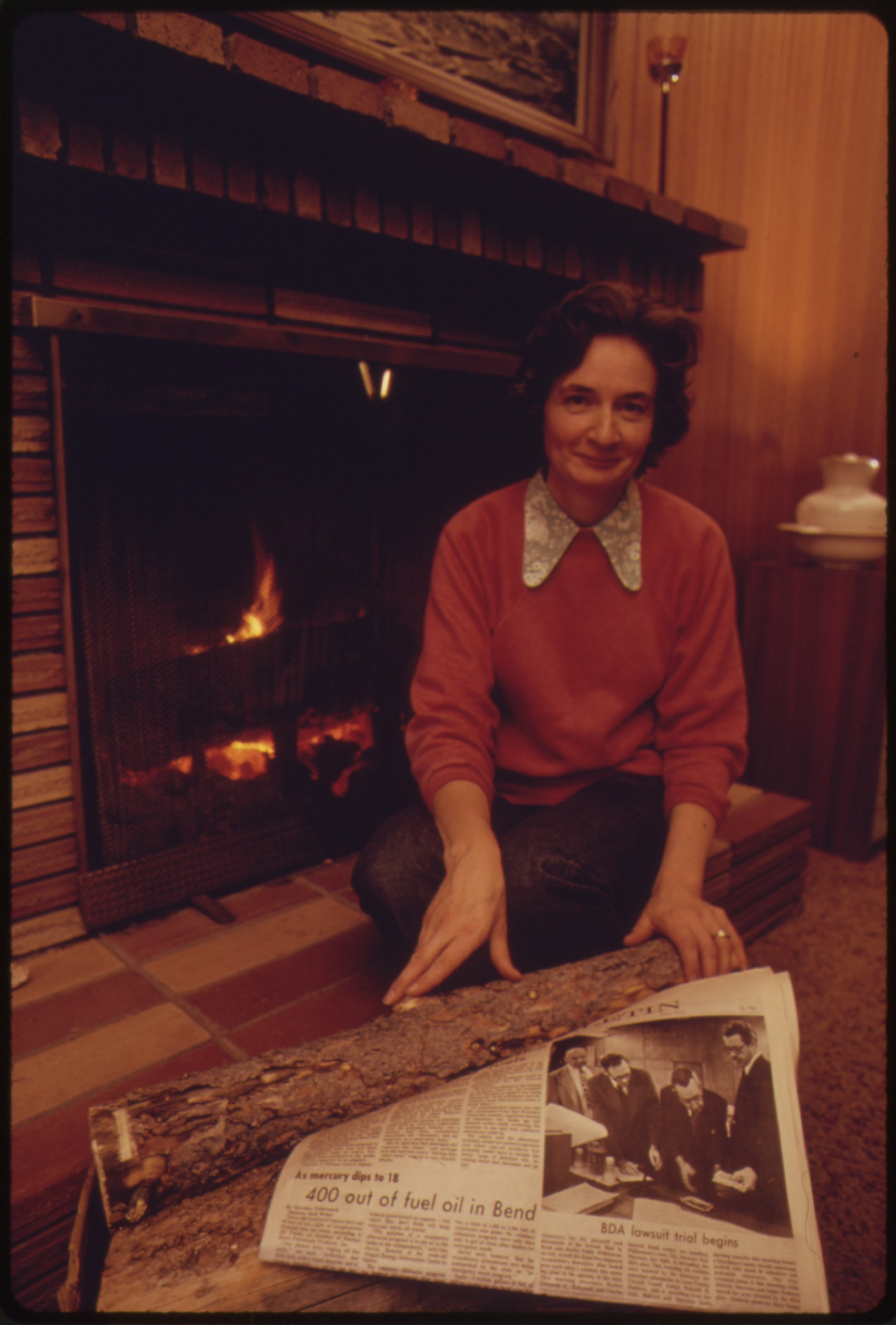
A woman in Oregon uses wood in a fireplace for heat. An October 1973 newspaper headline before her tells of the community's lack of heating oil.

The energy crisis led to greater interest in renewable energy, nuclear power and domestic fossil fuels. In 2013, Peter Grossman opined that American energy policies after the crisis became and remained dominated by crisis-mentality thinking, promoting expensive quick fixes and single-shot solutions that ignore market and technology realities. He wrote that instead of providing stable rules that support basic research while leaving plenty of scope for entrepreneurship and innovation, Congresses and presidents repeatedly backed policies which promised politically expedient solutions whose true prospects were doubtful.

The Brazilian government implemented its Proálcool (pro-alcohol) project in 1975 that mixed ethanol with gasoline for automotive fuel.

Israel was one of the few countries unaffected by the embargo, since it could extract sufficient oil from the Sinai. But to supplement Israel's over-taxed power grid, Harry Zvi Tabor, the father of Israel's solar industry, developed the prototype for a solar water heater now used in over 90% of Israeli homes.

=== Macroeconomy ===
Western central banks decided to sharply cut interest rates to encourage growth, deciding that inflation was a secondary concern. Although this was the orthodox macroeconomic prescription at the time, the resulting stagflation surprised economists and central bankers. The policy is now considered by some to have deepened and lengthened the adverse effects of the embargo. Recent research claims that in the period after 1985 the economy became more resilient to energy price increases.

The price shock created large current account deficits in oil-importing economies. A petrodollar recycling mechanism was created, through which OPEC surplus funds were channeled through the capital markets to the West to finance the current account deficits. The functioning of this mechanism required the relaxation of capital controls in oil-importing economies. It marked the beginning of an exponential growth of Western capital markets.

In the United States in 1974, seven of the 15 top Fortune 500 companies were oil companies, falling to four in 2014.

=== International relations ===
The crisis had a major impact on international relations and created a rift within NATO. Some European nations and Japan sought to disassociate themselves from United States foreign policy in the Middle East to avoid being targeted by the boycott. Arab oil producers linked any future policy changes to peace between the belligerents. To address this, the Nixon Administration began multilateral negotiations with the combatants. They arranged for Israel to pull back from the Sinai Peninsula and the Golan Heights. By January 18, 1974, US Secretary of State Henry Kissinger had negotiated an Israeli troop withdrawal from parts of the Sinai Peninsula. The promise of a negotiated settlement between Israel and Syria was enough to convince Arab oil producers to lift the embargo in March 1974. and again during the 1979 energy crisis.

==== United States ====
America's Cold War policies suffered a major blow from the embargo. They had focused on China and the Soviet Union, but the latent challenge to US hegemony coming from the Third World became evident. In 2004, declassified documents revealed that the US was so distraught by the rise in oil prices and being challenged by underdeveloped countries that they briefly considered military action to forcibly seize Middle Eastern oilfields in late 1973.

Although no explicit plan was mentioned, a conversation between US Secretary of Defense James Schlesinger and British Ambassador to the United States Lord Cromer revealed Schlesinger had told him that "it was no longer obvious to him that the US could not use force." British Prime Minister Edward Heath was so worried by this prospect that he ordered a British intelligence estimate of US intentions, which concluded that America "might consider it could not tolerate a situation in which the US and its allies were at the mercy of a small group of unreasonable countries", and that they would prefer a rapid operation to seize oilfields in Saudi Arabia and Kuwait, and possibly Abu Dhabi if military action was decided upon. Although the Soviet response to such an act would likely not involve force, intelligence warned "the American occupation would need to last 10 years as the West developed alternative energy sources, and would result in the 'total alienation' of the Arabs and much of the rest of the Third World."

==== NATO ====
Western Europe began switching from pro-Israel to more pro-Arab policies. This change strained the Western alliance. The US, which imported only 12% of its oil from the Middle East (compared with 80% for the Europeans and over 90% for Japan), remained staunchly committed to Israel. The percentage of US oil which comes from the nations bordering the Persian Gulf remained steady over the decades, with a figure of a little more than 10% in 2008.

With the embargo in place, many developed countries altered their policies regarding the Arab-Israeli conflict. These included the UK, which refused to allow the United States to use British bases and Cyprus to airlift resupplies to Israel, along with the rest of the members of the European Community.

Canada shifted towards a more pro-Arab position after displeasure was expressed towards Canada's mostly neutral position. "On the other hand, after the embargo the Canadian government moved quickly indeed toward the Arab position, despite its low dependence on Middle Eastern oil".

==== Japan ====
Although lacking historical connections to the Middle East, Japan was the country most dependent on Arab oil. 71% of its imported oil came from the Middle East in 1970. On November 7, 1973, the Saudi and Kuwaiti governments declared Japan a "nonfriendly" country, to encourage it to change its noninvolvement policy. It received a 5% production cut in December, causing a panic. On November 22, Japan issued a statement "asserting that Israel should withdraw from all of the 1967 territories, advocating Palestinian self-determination, and threatening to reconsider its policy toward Israel if Israel refused to accept these preconditions". By December 25, Japan was considered an Arab-friendly state.

==== Nonaligned nations ====
The oil embargo was announced roughly one month after a right-wing military coup in Chile led by General Augusto Pinochet toppled socialist president Salvador Allende on September 11, 1973. The response of the Nixon administration was to propose doubling arms sales. As a consequence, an opposing Latin American bloc was organized and financed in part by Venezuelan oil revenues, which quadrupled between 1970 and 1975.

A year after the start of the embargo, the UN's nonaligned bloc passed a resolution demanding the creation of a "New International Economic Order" under which nations within the global South would receive a greater share of benefits derived from the exploitation of southern resources and greater control over their self-development.

==== Arab states ====
Prior to the embargo, the geo-political competition between the Soviet Union and the United States, in combination with low oil prices that hindered the necessity and feasibility of alternative energy sources, presented the Arab States with financial security, moderate economic growth, and disproportionate international bargaining power.

The oil shock disrupted the status quo relationships between Arab countries and the US and USSR. At the time, Egypt, Syria and Iraq were allied with the USSR. Saudi Arabia, Turkey and Iran, plus Israel, aligned with the US. Vacillations in alignment often resulted in greater support from the respective superpowers. When Anwar Sadat became president of Egypt in 1970, he dismissed Soviet specialists in Egypt and reoriented towards the US.

Concerns over economic domination from increased Soviet oil production turned into fears of military aggression after the 1979 Soviet invasion of Afghanistan, a major turning point in Cold War geopolitics. Persian Gulf states turned toward the US for security guarantees against Soviet military action, coming at a time marked by increased American weapons sales, technology, and outright military presence to various US-allied nations. Saudi Arabia and Iran became increasingly dependent on American security assurances to manage both external and internal threats, including increased military competition between them over increased oil revenues. Both states were competing for preeminence in the Persian Gulf, and using increased revenues to fund expanded militaries. By 1979, Saudi arms purchases from the US were five times larger than Israel's.

In the wake of the 1979 Iranian Revolution the Saudis were forced to deal with the prospect of internal destabilization via the radicalism of Islamism, a reality which was quickly revealed in the Grand Mosque seizure in Mecca by Wahhabi extremists in November 1979, and a Shiite Muslim revolt in the oil rich Al-Hasa region of Saudi Arabia in December of the same year, which was known as the 1979 Qatif Uprising. Saudi Arabia is a near-absolute monarchy, an Arabic speaking country, and has a Sunni Muslim majority, while Persian speaking Iran since 1979 is an Islamist theocracy with a Shiite Muslim majority, which explains the current hostility between Saudi Arabia and Iran.

Before the Iranian Revolution the usually pro-American, anti-communist and largely Sunni Muslim Saudi Arabians were somewhat wary of the pro-Soviet relations held by the Ba'athist socialist and relatively secularist republican dictatorship of Iraq, the latter of which is a majority Shiite Muslim Arab nation which was ruled by a Sunni Muslim Arab minority before the Iraq War, and how that affected the Saudis' own relations with the Iraqis, because these two oil-rich Arab nations share a long land border with each other.

=== Automobile industry ===
The oil crisis sent a signal to the auto industry globally, which changed many aspects of production and usage for decades to come.

==== Western Europe ====
After World War II, most West European countries taxed motor fuel to limit imports, and as a result most cars made in Europe were smaller and more economical than their American counterparts. By the late 1960s, increasing incomes supported rising car sizes.

The oil crisis pushed West European car buyers away from larger, less economical cars. The most notable result of this transition was the rise in popularity of compact hatchbacks. The only notable small hatchbacks built in Western Europe before the oil crisis were the Peugeot 104, Renault 5 and Fiat 127. By the end of the decade, the market had expanded with the introduction of the Ford Fiesta, Opel Kadett (sold as the Vauxhall Astra in Great Britain), Chrysler Sunbeam and Citroën Visa.

Buyers looking for larger cars were increasingly drawn to medium-sized hatchbacks. Virtually unknown in Europe in 1973, by the end of the decade they were gradually replacing sedans as the mainstay of this sector. Between 1973 and 1980, medium-sized hatchbacks were launched across Europe: the Chrysler/Simca Horizon, Fiat Ritmo (Strada in the UK), Ford Escort MK3, Renault 14, Volvo 340 / 360, Opel Kadett, and Volkswagen Golf.

These cars were considerably more economical than the traditional saloons they were replacing, and attracted buyers who traditionally bought larger vehicles. Some 15 years after the oil crisis, hatchbacks dominated most European small and medium car markets, and had gained a substantial share of the large family car market.

==== United States ====
Before the energy crisis, large, heavy, and powerful cars were popular. By 1971, the standard engine in a Chevrolet Caprice was a 400-cubic inch (6.5 liter) V8. The wheelbase of this car was 121.5 inches (3,090 mm), and Motor Trend's 1972 road test of the similar Chevrolet Impala achieved no more than 15 highway miles per gallon. In the 15 years prior to the 1973 oil crisis, gasoline prices in the US had lagged well behind inflation.

The crisis reduced the demand for large cars. Japanese imports, primarily the Toyota Corona, the Toyota Corolla, the Datsun B210, the Datsun 510, the Honda Civic, the Mitsubishi Galant (a captive import from Chrysler sold as the Dodge Colt), the Subaru DL, and later the Honda Accord all had four cylinder engines that were more fuel efficient than the typical American V8 and six cylinder engines. Japanese imports became mass-market leaders with unibody construction and front-wheel drive, which became de facto standards.

From Europe, the Volkswagen Beetle, the Volkswagen Fastback, the Renault 8, the Renault LeCar, and the Fiat Brava were successful. Detroit responded with the Ford Pinto, the Ford Maverick, the Chevrolet Vega, the Chevrolet Nova, the Plymouth Valiant and the Plymouth Volaré. American Motors sold its homegrown Gremlin, Hornet and Pacer models.

Some buyers lamented the small size of the first Japanese compacts, and both Toyota and Nissan (then known as Datsun) introduced larger cars such as the Toyota Corona Mark II, the Toyota Cressida, the Mazda 616 and Datsun 810, which added passenger space and amenities such as air conditioning, power steering, AM-FM radios, and even power windows and central locking without increasing the price of the vehicle. A decade after the 1973 oil crisis, Honda, Toyota and Nissan, affected by the 1981 voluntary export restraints, opened US assembly plants and established their luxury divisions (Acura, Lexus and Infiniti, respectively) to distinguish themselves from their mass-market brands.

Compact trucks were introduced, such as the Toyota Hilux and the Datsun Truck, followed by the Mazda Truck (sold as the Ford Courier), and the Isuzu-built Chevrolet LUV. Mitsubishi rebranded its Forte as the Dodge D-50 a few years after the oil crisis. Mazda, Mitsubishi and Isuzu had joint partnerships with Ford, Chrysler, and GM, respectively. Later, the American makers introduced their domestic replacements (Ford Ranger, Dodge Dakota and the Chevrolet S10/GMC S-15), ending their captive import policy.

An increase in imported cars into North America forced General Motors, Ford and Chrysler to introduce smaller and fuel-efficient models for domestic sales. The Dodge Omni / Plymouth Horizon from Chrysler, the Ford Fiesta and the Chevrolet Chevette all had four-cylinder engines and room for at least four passengers by the late 1970s. By 1985, the average American vehicle moved 17.4 miles per gallon, compared to 13.5 in 1970. The improvements stayed, even though the price of a barrel of oil remained constant at $12 from 1974 to 1979.

Sales of large sedans for most makes, except Chrysler products, recovered within two model years of the 1973 crisis. The Cadillac DeVille and Fleetwood, Buick Electra, Oldsmobile 98, Lincoln Continental, Mercury Marquis, and various other luxury oriented sedans became popular again in the mid-1970s. The only full-size models that did not recover were lower price models such as the Chevrolet Bel Air and Ford Galaxie 500. Slightly smaller models such as the Oldsmobile Cutlass, Chevrolet Monte Carlo, Ford Thunderbird and various others sold well.

Economical imports succeeded alongside heavy, expensive vehicles. In 1976, Toyota sold 346,920 cars (average weight around 2,100 lbs), while Cadillac sold 309,139 cars (average weight around 5,000 lbs).

Federal safety standards, such as NHTSA Federal Motor Vehicle Safety Standard 215 (pertaining to safety bumpers), and compacts like the 1974 Mustang I were a prelude to the DOT "downsize" revision of vehicle categories. By 1977, GM's full-sized cars reflected the crisis. By 1979, virtually all "full-size" American cars had shrunk, featuring smaller engines and smaller outside dimensions. Chrysler ended production of their full-sized luxury sedans at the end of the 1981 model year, moving instead to a full front-wheel drive lineup for 1982, except for the M-body Dodge Diplomat/Plymouth Gran Fury and Chrysler New Yorker Fifth Avenue sedans.

== Consequences ==
=== Decline of OPEC ===
OPEC soon lost its preeminent position, and in 1981, its production was surpassed by that of other countries. Additionally, its own member nations were divided. Saudi Arabia, trying to recover market share, increased production, pushing prices down, shrinking or eliminating profits for high-cost producers. The world price, which had peaked during the 1979 energy crisis at nearly $40 per barrel, decreased during the 1980s to less than $10 per barrel. Adjusted for inflation, oil briefly fell back to pre-1973 levels. This "sale" price was a windfall for oil-importing nations, both developing and developed.

During the Iran–Iraq War of 1980–1988, the stated war aim of Iran was to overthrow the Baath regime in Iraq. As a consequence, Saudi Arabia and the other Arab Gulf states leaned in a very pro-Iraqi neutrality during the war. As a part of its policy of supporting Iraq, Saudi Arabia pumped out oil in massive quantities to lower the price as a way of hurting Iran's economy.

The low price of oil also hurt Iraq's economy, which forced Iraq to borrow massive sums of money, putting Iraq deeply into debt. In contrast, Iran refused to borrow any money because of its refusal to pay interest on any loans, and paid the costs of the war directly from the sale of its oil.

Iran's revenue from the sale of oil went from $20 billion US dollars per year in 1982 to $5 billion US dollars per year by 1988, which pushed Iran to the verge of bankruptcy and forced Iran to make peace with Iraq later in 1988. During the war, the Iranian delegation at OPEC tried very hard to have the group cut production to raise prices, but were blocked by the other delegations led by the Saudi delegation, who insisted on more oil production.

=== Oil sources diversification ===
The embargo encouraged new venues for energy exploration, including Alaska, the North Sea, the Caspian Sea, and the Caucasus. Exploration in the Caspian Basin and Siberia became profitable. Cooperation changed into a far more adversarial relationship as the USSR increased its production. By 1980, the Soviet Union had become the world's largest producer.

Part of the decline in prices and economic and geopolitical power of OPEC came from the move to alternative energy sources. OPEC had relied on price inelasticity to maintain high consumption, but had underestimated the extent to which conservation and other sources of supply would eventually reduce demand. Electricity generation from nuclear power and natural gas, home heating from natural gas, and ethanol-blended gasoline all reduced the demand for oil.

=== Economic impact ===
The drop in prices presented a serious problem for oil-exporting countries in northern Europe and the Persian Gulf. Heavily populated, impoverished countries, whose economies were largely dependent on oil—including Mexico, Nigeria, Algeria, and Libya—did not prepare for a market reversal that left them in sometimes desperate situations.

When reduced demand and increased production glutted the world market in the mid-1980s, oil prices plummeted and the cartel lost its unity. Mexico (a non-member), Nigeria, and Venezuela, whose economies had expanded in the 1970s, faced near-bankruptcy, and even Saudi Arabian economic power was significantly weakened. The divisions within OPEC made concerted action more difficult. As of 2015, OPEC has never approached its earlier dominance.

== Graphs and charts ==
A graph of oil prices from 1861 to 2015, showing a sharp increase in 1973 and again during the 1979 energy crisis. The orange line is adjusted for inflation.

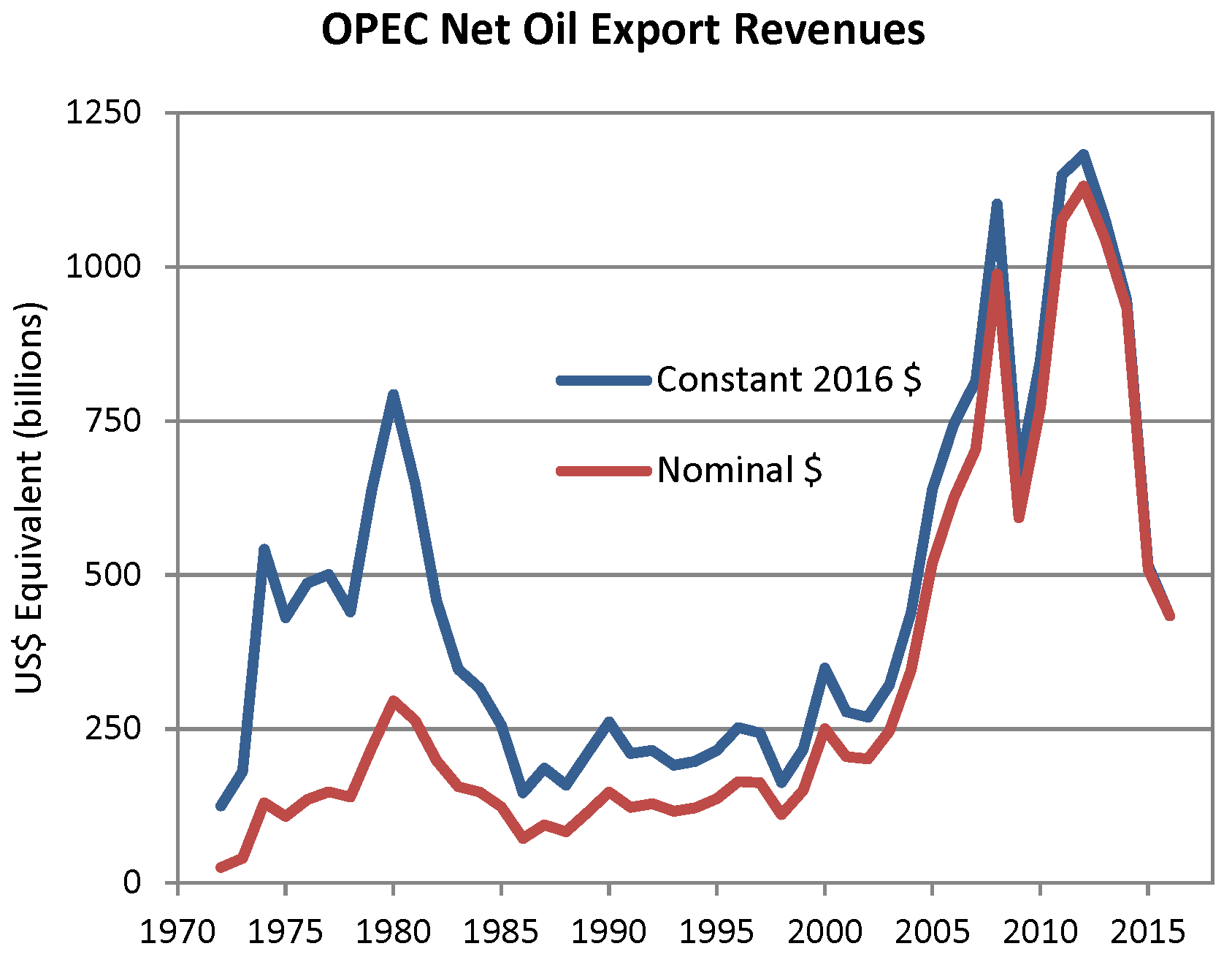
Fluctuations of OPEC net oil export revenues since 1972.

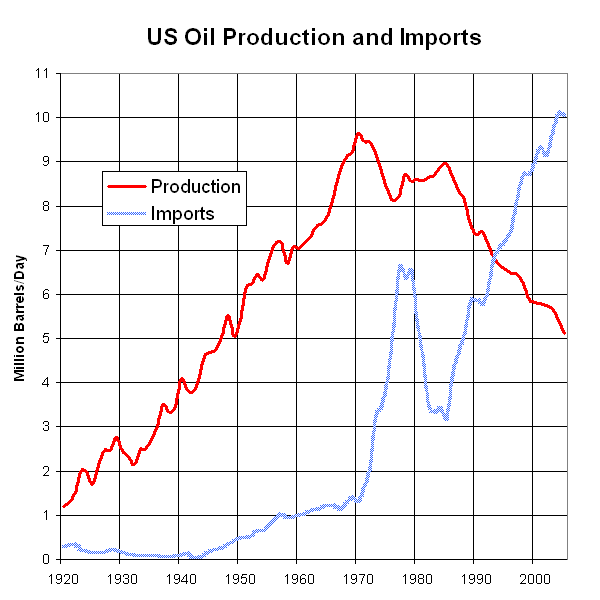
US oil production and imports

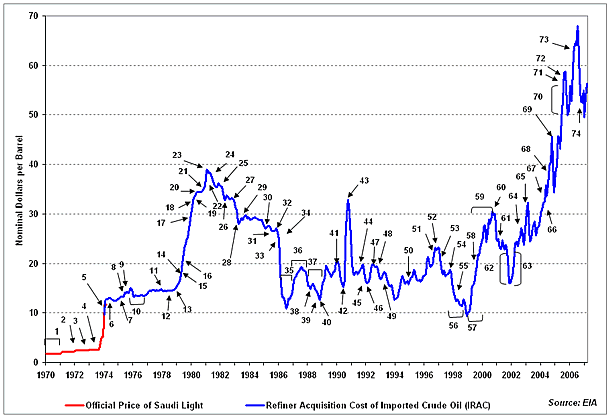
The price of oil during the embargo. The graph is based on the nominal, not real, price of oil, and so overstates prices at the end.

== See also ==
- 1967 Oil Embargo
- 1970s energy crisis
- 1970s commodities boom
- 1979 oil crisis
- 1990 oil price shock
- 2000s energy crisis
- 2020s energy crisis
- 2026 Iran war fuel crisis
- Hubbert peak theory
- Supply shock
- Petrodollar recycling
- Energy Crisis '74
