= I Am an American =

I Am an American may refer to:

- "I Am an American", a 1916 poem by Elias Lieberman
- I Am an American (1944 film) directed by Crane Wilbur
- I Am an American (film), a 2001 public service announcement
