= E pluribus unum =

Traditional motto of the United States

E pluribus unum included in the Great Seal of the United States, being one of the nation's mottos at the time of the seal's creation

E pluribus unum (/iː ˈplʊrɪbəs ˈuːnəm/ ee PLUURR-ih-bəs OO-nəm, Classical Latin: [eː ˈpluːrɪbʊs ˈuːnʊ̃], Latin: [e ˈpluribus ˈunum]) (Latin for 'out of many, one', or 'one out of many') is a traditional motto of the United States, appearing on the Great Seal along with Annuit cœptis (Latin for [He] favors [our] undertakings) and Novus ordo seclorum (Latin for new order of the ages) which appear on the reverse of the Great Seal; its inclusion on the seal was suggested by Pierre Eugene du Simitiere and approved in an act of the Congress of the Confederation in 1782. While its status as national motto was for many years unofficial, E pluribus unum was still considered the de facto motto of the United States from its early history. Eventually, the U.S. Congress passed an act in 1956 (H. J. Resolution 396), adopting "In God We Trust" as the official motto.

That the phrase E pluribus unum has thirteen letters makes its use symbolic of the original Thirteen Colonies which rebelled against the rule of the Kingdom of Great Britain and became the first thirteen states, represented today as the thirteen stripes on the American flag.

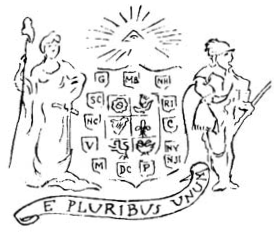
Original 1776 design for the Great Seal by Pierre Eugene du Simitiere. The shields with 13 initials of the colonies surrounding symbols for the six origin nations: England (rose), Scotland (thistle), Ireland (harp), France (fleur-de-lis), Holland (lion) and Germany (eagle) linked together with motto.

The meaning of the phrase originated from the concept that out of the union of the original Thirteen Colonies emerged a new single nation. It is emblazoned across the scroll and clenched in the eagle's beak on the Great Seal of the United States.

== Origin ==
The 13-letter motto was suggested in 1776 by Pierre Eugene du Simitiere to the committee responsible for developing the seal. At the time of the American Revolution, the phrase appeared regularly on the title page of the London-based Gentleman's Magazine, founded in 1731, which collected articles from many sources into one periodical. This usage in turn can be traced back to the London-based Huguenot Peter Anthony Motteux, who had employed the adage for his The Gentleman's Journal, or the Monthly Miscellany (1692–1694). The phrase is similar to a Latin translation of a variation of Heraclitus's tenth fragment, "The one is made up of all things, and all things issue from the one" (ἐκ πάντων ἓν καὶ ἐξ ἑνὸς πάντα). A variant of the phrase was used in "Moretum", a poem belonging to the Appendix Virgiliana, describing (on the surface at least) the making of moretum, a kind of herb and cheese spread related to modern pesto. In the poem text, color est e pluribus unus describes the blending of colors into one. St Augustine used a variant of the phrase, ex pluribus unum facere (make one out of many), in his Confessions. Cicero would use a variant of the phrase in a paraphrase of Pythagoras in his De Officiis, as part of his discussion of basic family and social bonds as the origin of societies, stating "When each person loves the other as much as himself, it makes one out of many (unum fiat ex pluribus), as Pythagoras wishes things to be in friendship."

While Annuit cœptis and Novus ordo seclorum appear on the reverse side of the Great Seal, E pluribus unum appears on the obverse side of the seal (designed by Charles Thomson), the image of which is used as the national emblem of the United States, and appears on official documents such as passports. It also appears on the seal of the president, the vice president, the United States Congress, the United States House of Representatives, the United States Senate, and the United States Supreme Court.

== Usage on coins ==
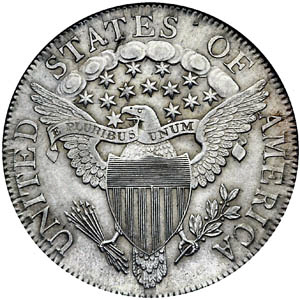
Draped Bust half dollar (reverse), 1807

Dime E pluribus unum engraving
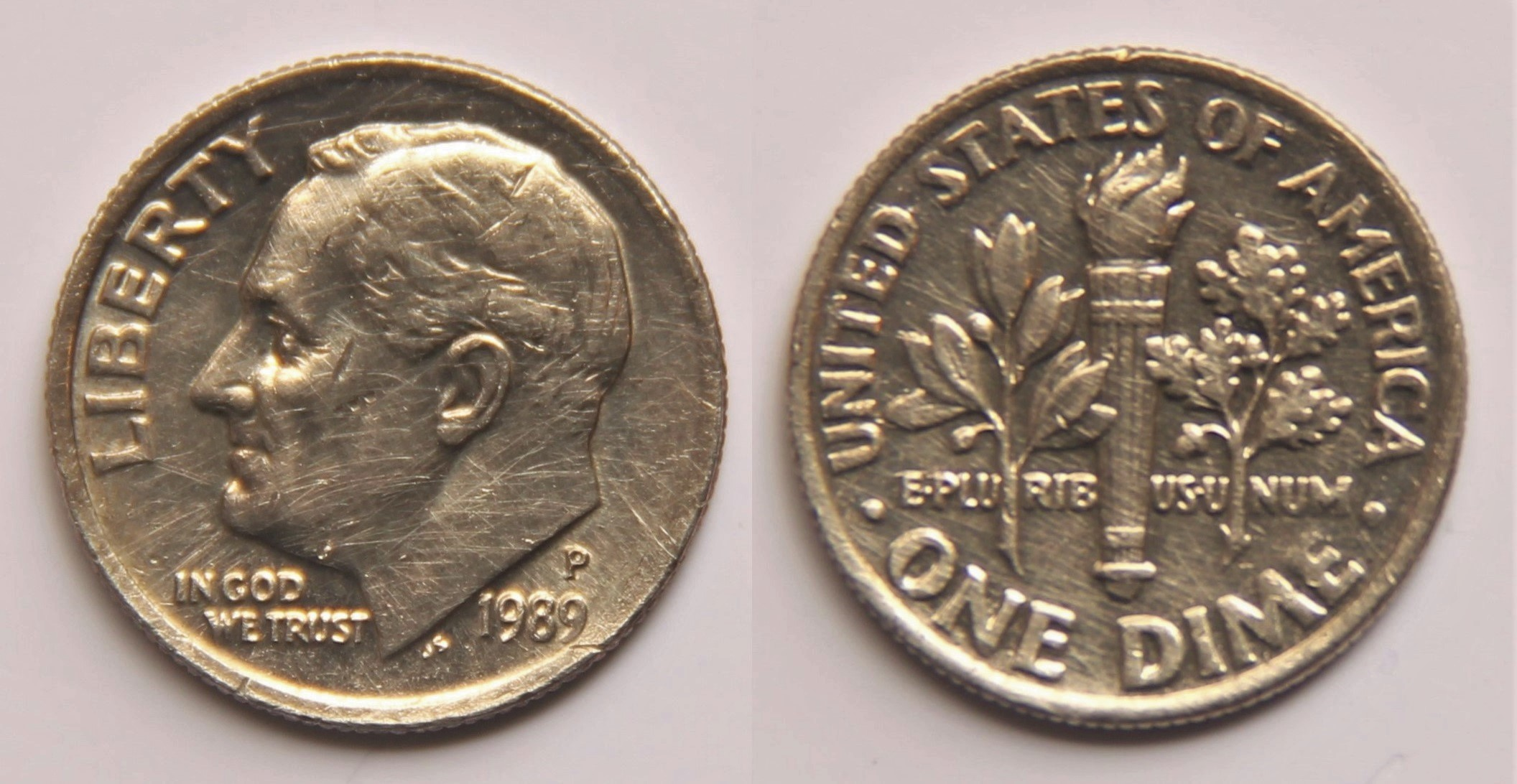
First side of the image: Obverse: Portrait of Franklin D. Roosevelt, year and US national motto (In God We Trust)
Second side of the image: Reverse: E pluribus unum, olive branch, torch and oak branch, face-value and country

The first coins with E pluribus unum were dated 1786 and struck under the authorization of New Jersey by Thomas Goadsby and Albion Cox in Rahway, New Jersey. The motto had no New Jersey linkage but was likely an available die that had been created by Walter Mould the previous year for a failed federal coinage proposal. Mould was also authorized by New Jersey to strike state coppers with this motto and did so beginning in early 1787 in Morristown, New Jersey. Lt. Col. Seth Read of Uxbridge, Massachusetts was said to have been instrumental in having E pluribus unum placed on U.S. coins. Seth Read and his brother Joseph Read had been authorized by the Massachusetts General Court to mint coppers in 1786. In March 1786, Seth Read petitioned the Massachusetts General Court, both the House and the Senate, for a franchise to mint coins, both copper and silver, and "it was concurred". E pluribus unum, written in capital letters, is included on most U.S. currency, with some exceptions to the letter spacing (such as the reverse of the dime). It is also embossed on the edge of the dollar coin. (See United States coinage and paper bills in circulation).

According to the U.S. Treasury, the motto E pluribus unum was first used on U.S. coinage in 1795, when the reverse of the half-eagle ($5 gold) coin presented the main features of the Great Seal of the United States. E pluribus unum is inscribed on the Great Seal's scroll. The motto was added to certain silver coins in 1798, and soon appeared on all of the coins made out of precious metals (gold and silver). In 1834, it was dropped from most of the gold coins to mark the change in the standard fineness of the coins. In 1837, it was dropped from the silver coins, marking the era of the Revised Mint Code. The Coinage Act of 1873 made the inscription a requirement of law upon the coins of the United States. E pluribus unum appears on all U.S. coins currently being manufactured, including presidential dollar coins whose production started in 2007, where it is inscribed on the edge along with "In God We Trust" and the year and mint mark. After the revolution, Rahway, New Jersey became the home of the first national mint to create a coin bearing the inscription E pluribus unum.

In a quality control error in early 2007, the Philadelphia Mint issued some one-dollar coins without E pluribus unum on the rim; these coins have since become collectibles.

The 2009 and 2010 pennies feature a new design on the back, which displays the phrase E pluribus unum in larger letters than in previous years.

== Other usages ==
=== U.S. government ===
- Besides the United States Great Seal's obverse and most American coins, the motto appears over the tribune in the United States Senate chamber, on the flags and seals of both the House of Representatives and the Senate, the president, the Supreme Court and the Army, and on the state flags of Michigan, New York, North Dakota, and Wisconsin.

=== Other countries' governments ===
- It appears on the logo of the Shire of Boulia, Queensland, Australia.
- The motto appears on the coat of arms of the city of Mongaguá in Brazil.
- A variant of the motto, unum e pluribus, is used by the Borough of Wokingham in Berkshire, England.
- This motto has also been used by the Scoutspataljon, a professional infantry battalion of the Estonian Defence Forces, since 1918.
- An English version of the motto, Out of many, one people, is used as the official motto of Jamaica.

=== Sports ===
- The motto appears on the logo of the United States Golf Association.
- The motto is used on the emblem of the Portuguese sports club Sport Lisboa e Benfica since 1904 (initially by one of its predecessors, Sport Lisboa). Similarly to the Great Seal of the United States, the emblem has a shield and an eagle on top of it serving as a crest and holding a scroll with the motto (although the scroll is beneath the eagle).

=== Arts and media ===
- This motto was also used in Stanislaw Lem's novel, Eden (cited by Doctor).
- "E Pluribus Unum" is a march by the composer Fred Jewell, written in 1917 during World War I.
- The Wizard of Oz's title character uses the motto to describe his (and Dorothy's) homeland of Kansas: the land of E pluribus unum.
- Bugs Bunny misinterprets the motto at the end of Roman Legion-Hare: "E pluribus uranium".
- "E unibus pluram" is the title of a 1996 essay by David Foster Wallace which appears in the collection A Supposedly Fun Thing I'll Never Do Again.
- In 2001, following the September 11 attacks, the Ad Council and Texas ad agency GSD&M launched a public service announcement in which ethnically diverse people say "I Am an American"; near the end of the PSA, a black screen shows and the phrase E pluribus unum is seen with the English translation underneath.
- Episode 6 of the third season of Stranger Things is titled "E Pluribus Unum". The title refers to the Mind Flayer, the season's antagonist, being one monster formed out of many bodies.
- Pluribus (stylized as PLUR1BUS) is an Apple TV science fiction television series created by Vince Gilligan. Its title refers to a hive mind formed by linking the minds of nearly the entire global population.
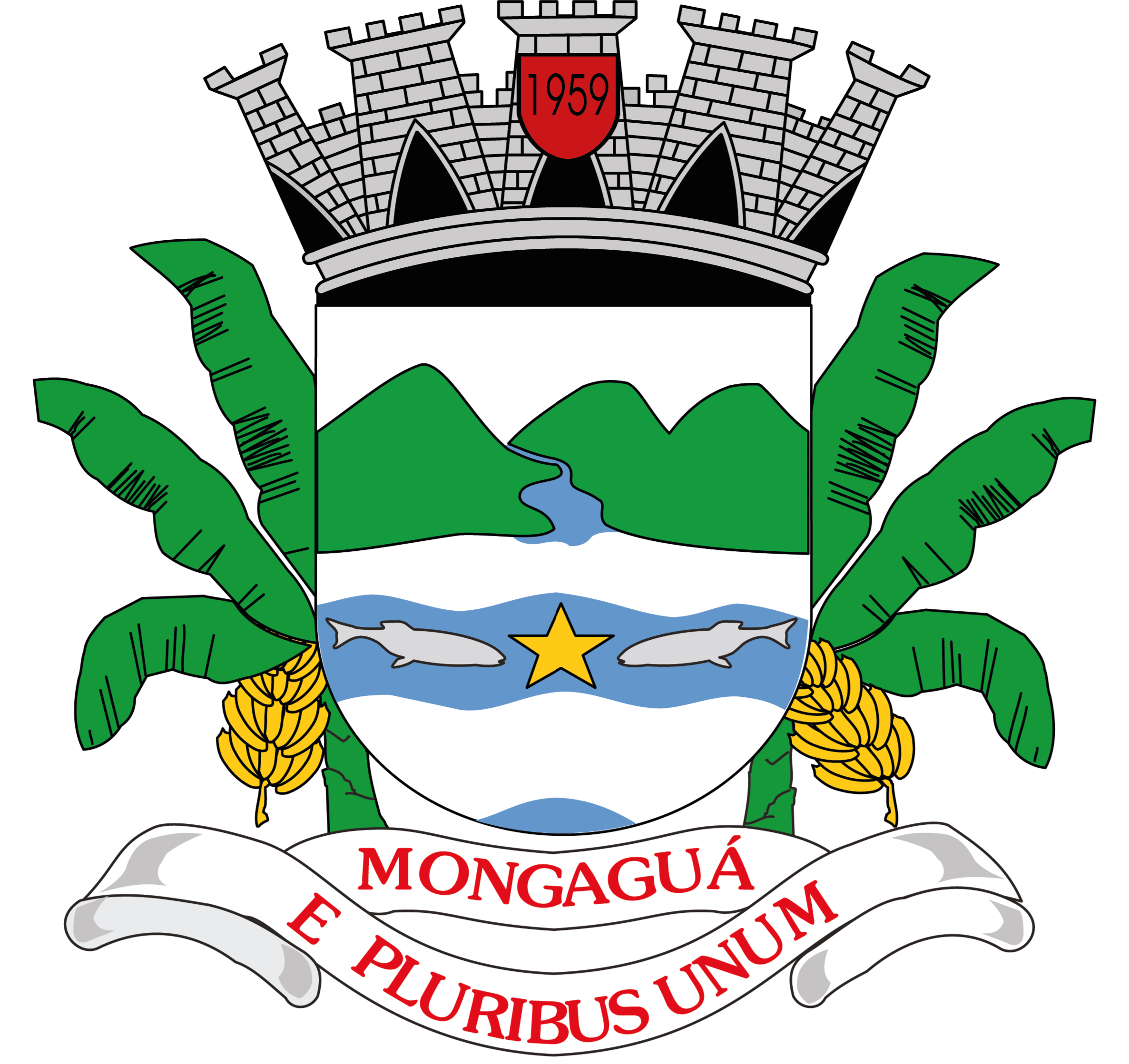
The arms of Mongágua, Brazil

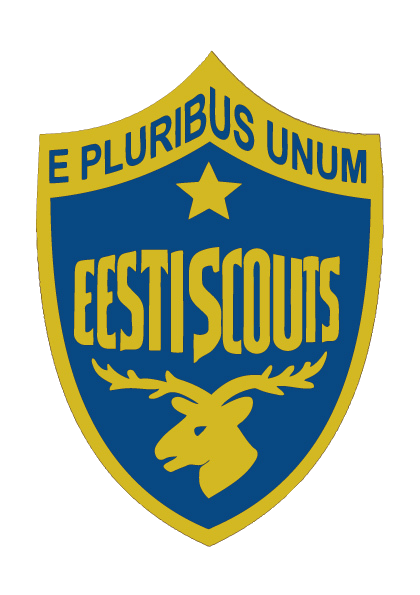
The logo of Estonian Scouts Battalion

== See also ==
- Unity in diversity – Expression of harmony and unity between dissimilar individuals or groups
- Unity in variety – Aesthetic principle stating that beauty is derived from combining diverse components
- In varietate concordia
- Bhinneka Tunggal Ika – Indonesian national motto
- United we stand, divided we fall – American mottos
- List of Latin phrases
- List of national mottos
- List of U.S. state and territory mottos
