= I Am an American (film) =

Public service announcement following 9/11

I am an American is a public service announcement (PSA) 30-second film sponsored by the Ad Council, first aired in 2001 in a tribute to the September 11 attacks.

== Plot ==
The PSA, created by Austin, Texas ad agency GSD&M and sponsored by the Advertising Council, was a tribute PSA launched in 2001 to salute to all the deaths and tragedies of 9/11. The PSA shows many scenes of people in the United States saying "I am an American", referring to their lives that they live in America. The PSA shows that they have hope during the tragic event, which occurred on September 11, 2001. Near the end of the PSA, the camera goes to a black background which shows the Latin phrase "E pluribus unum" with English translation underneath partially which reads "Out of many," and seconds later, the finishing of the phrase "one." fades in. The PSA ends with a girl waving an American flag in her hand, followed by the Ad Council logo on a black background.

To commemorate the 10th anniversary of 9/11, the Ad Council reaired the PSA, with a slight update to the end scene, where the words "Ten years later, we are still one." were added, with the Ad Council logo on the bottom left corner on the screen.

== See also ==
- "God Bless America"
- "United we stand, divided we fall"
- Elias Lieberman (author of 1916 poem "I Am an American")
