= Project Independence =

Initiative under the Nixon Administration

Project Independence was an initiative announced by U.S. President Richard Nixon on November 7, 1973, in reaction to the OAPEC oil embargo and the resulting 1973 oil crisis. Recalling the Manhattan Project, he stated that the goal of Project Independence was to achieve energy self-sufficiency for the United States by 1980, through a national commitment to energy conservation and development of alternative sources of energy. Nixon declared that American science, technology and industry could free America from its dependence on imported oil, and establish its energy independence.

== Initiatives ==
Some of the important initiatives to emerge from Project Independence included lowering highway speeds to 55 mph (89 km/h), converting oil power plants to coal, completion of the Trans-Alaska Pipeline System and diverting federal funds from highway construction to mass transit.

== Failure to decrease consumption ==
Despite these initiatives, Project Independence failed to prevent the increase in American oil consumption after the 1973–74 embargo; its dependence on foreign suppliers rose from 36% to almost 50% in 1979, when questions of nuclear energy safety arose domestically, and the next energy crisis emerged overseas.
