= Educational advertisement =

Educational advertisements are ad campaigns in which the creators attempt to inform, update, or persuade the public to engage in or avoid current issues. This type of advertisement is often negatively associated with propaganda. While similar to public service announcements, educational advertisements often cross into commercial fields whereas public service announcements are oriented on strict non-profit basis. Educational advertisements focus on a number of modern social, political, religious, and consumer-based issues. They traditionally appear on television and radio, but more and more campaigns are turning to the internet, especially email, as a cheap and efficient way to spread their messages. While most educational advertisements are deployed in the United States of America, there have been campaigns across Europe, Canada, and New Zealand. However, due to the dependence on technology to broadcast their messages, campaigns usually appear in developed countries where the largest possible population is likely to encounter their message.

== History ==
Educational advertising emerged with the advent of broadcast television. The Ad Council of the first genuine organizations specializing in the creation and management of these advertisements. This council played a crucial role in garnering public support during World War II. However, during the social upheaval that followed in the 1960s, they soon focused primarily on public service announcements rather than some of the more commercial aspects that educational advertisements are associated with. Some of these included the famous “Crying Indian” and “Smokey Bear” campaigns.

This type of advertising first began in America during the World War II. It was first introduced by radio broadcasters, and advertisers by promoting war efforts and ultimately, propaganda. Educational advertising, also considered public service announcements Public service announcements, have made a major impact in society and history. Having advertisements that educate the people, is helpful in various aspects, but mostly helps spread the word of an important cause or event to the masses of people at one time. Today, educational advertising can range from non-profitable organizations to political campaigns.

Educational advertisements, rather than attempt to inform the public about activities damaging to them or the environment, focused more on ways people could get engaged and involved in social and political issues of the day. These advertisements generally had some motive aside from simply delivering information. Some of these included war bond ads which, while lacking corporate sponsors, still attempted to sell the public something instead of just delivering information. Some of these included war bond ads which, while lacking corporate sponsors, still attempted to sell the public something instead of just delivering information. Other wartime advertisements include the “Loose Lips Sink Ships” campaign that began in Britain and the “Stamp ‘em Out” campaign that spread through America. Most of these types of educational advertisements, especially those airing in the U.S.S., can be closely associated with American propaganda efforts. This is one of the main reasons that these types of advertisement campaigns are often cast in a negative light. Their primary focus is not always to inform the public, but persuade them into some sort of action for mainly political reasons.

== Public reaction ==
There are mixed views on the broadcasting of educational advertisements. While many people see these messages as good ways to reach segments of the populace that wouldn’t otherwise put forth the effort to research current social issues, others worry about the true motives behind the campaigners. They argue that widespread non-profit advertisements should remain as neutral as possible and avoid efforts to persuade people politically. Despite efforts to shut certain campaigns down, educational advertisements still appear in all manners of media, especially since email became the central form of communication.

== Recent campaigns ==
In the final stretch of the 2008 Presidential race, all forms of media were saturated with different educational advertisement campaigns. One of the more famous of these was Barack Obama’s thirty-minute infomercial “American Stories, American Solutions”, which aired on seven different networks. While this was not the first thirty-minute political advertisement (H. Ross Perot in 1992) to air on national television, it did reach over six million viewers nationwide. Many believed such an advertisement was excessive and intrusive as it left only one major broadcasting company (ABC) open.

The We Campaign is an example of a massive online campaign circulating through email today. While it in itself primarily raises awareness for the environment as a public service announcement would, it is also an offshoot of a larger political organization called the Alliance for Climate Protection. This organization, founded by former US Vice President Al Gore, serves as a political platform from which Gore can deliver his message. It is due to its political associations that this campaign is considered primarily an educational advertisement instead of a public service announcement.

“Vote or Die”, a campaign started by the Citizen Change organization, is another example of a politically charged educational advertisement. This campaign, headed by celebrity Sean Combs was directed at America’s youth during the Elections in 2004. This campaign was criticized its violent and over the top approach to voter apathy. After a rather ineffective run, it largely disbanded in 2006.

== Controversy ==
Educational advertisements often spark major controversies because of their attempts to persuade the public on political and religious matters. Lyle Stuart, publisher of “L. Ron Hubbard: Messiah or Madman?” took all of the profits from the book and used them to create an educational advertisement against the Church of Scientology. These types of campaigns which directly attack religious associations are often seen as very controversial.

Google recently banned a United Kingdom evangelical Christian charity from placing advertisements focused on abortion. Although the campaign was entirely factual, such displays often stir emotions that result in negative attention for corporations.

== Sources ==
- Hoveland, Roxanne, and Gary Wilcox. Advertising in Society. Chicago: NTC Business Books, 1989. Print.
- Dyer, Gillian. Advertising as Communication. New York: Methuen & Co. Ltd, 1982. Print.
- Smelt, Maurice. What Advertising Is. London: Pelham Books Ltd, 1972. Print.
- Ekelund, Robert, and David Saurman. Advertising and the Market Process. San Francisco: Pacific Research Institute for Public Policy, 1988. Print.
- Cronin, Anne. Advertising Myths. New York: Routledge, 2004. Print.
- Rank, Hugh. The Pitch. Park Forest IA: The Counter-Propaganda Press, 1982. Print.
- Dupuis, Martin, and Keith Boeckelman. Barack Obama, the New Face of American Politics. Westport CT: Praeger Publishers, 2008. Print.
- "We Can Solve It." Climate Protection. Climate Protection. 15 Apr 2009 <http://www.wecansolveit.org/>.
- "Spotlight on Golden Age Advertising." Wartime Advertising. 15 Apr 2009 <http://www.digitaldeliftp.com/LookAround/advertspot_cocacola5.htm>.
- "Google AdWords." Information Week. Information Week. 15 Apr 2009 <http://www.informationweek.com/news/internet/google/showArticle.jhtml?articleID=210602191>.
- "Alliance for Climate Protection." Climate . Climate Protection. 15 Apr 2009 <https://web.archive.org/web/20071014010801/http://www.climateprotect.org/>.
- "Ad Council: About Ad Council." Ad Council. Ad Council. 15 Apr 2009 <https://web.archive.org/web/20090220140605/http://adcouncil.org/default.aspx?id=68>.
