= Posted oil price =

Oil price pre-1980

The posted price of oil was the price at which oil companies offered to purchase oil from oil-producing governments. This price was set by the oil companies and used to calculate the share of oil revenues that oil-producing countries would receive. Between 1957 and 1972, the posted price was greater than the market price of crude oil. Between 1961 and 1970 the market price hovered between $1.30 and $1.50 per barrel, while the posted price was a constant $1.80.

== Origins ==
Before Standard Oil was broken up by the United States Supreme Court in 1911, they used to "post" the price they were willing to pay for crude oil. Until 1895, crude oil was sold on the exchange at Oil City, Pennsylvania, but in January 1895 the Seep Purchasing Company, which purchased 80% of Pennsylvania and Ohio's crude oil production for Standard Oil, posted a notice that the price of oil would "be as high as the market of the world will justify, but will not necessarily be the price bill on the exchange for certificate oil".

The system continued after 1911 where large buyers would post a fixed buying price. Historically, the posted price in the Middle East, or Venezuela was calculated based on the CIF New York price, which was itself based on the FOB Gulf of Mexico price. In other words, the posted price in New York was the FOB Gulf of Mexico price plus the cost of freight. Thus, if the posted price per barrel of crude oil was $3.16 in New York, after deducting the freight between New York and Kuwait ($1.19) and the US tax on oil ($0.11 per barrel), the posted price in Kuwait would be $1.87 per barrel.

== History ==
=== 1950s: Profit-sharing ===
By the 1950s, fixed royalty payments had been replaced by 50-50 profit sharing arrangements following the 1950 ARAMCO deal. The posted price, sometimes also called the published price, is not the price that is actually received by oil-producing governments. This price, historically set by the oil companies and later by OPEC, is used to calculate the taxes and royalties that will be paid to governments under profit-sharing agreements. The use of the posted price as a pricing basis for the 50-50 share agreements varied from country to country; the posted price was not adopted as the basis in Saudi Arabia until 1955, but had been used in Iraq since the Iraqi government's revised agreement with the Iraqi Petroleum Company was negotiated in 1952.

=== OPEC ===
After oil companies lowered the posted price, five oil producing countries formed OPEC in 1960: Venezuela, Saudi Arabia, Kuwait, Iran and Iraq. In 1970 the price of crude oil was still $1.35 and the supply of oil exceeded demand. Due to a decline in value of the US dollar relative to gold in 1971, the Tehran Agreement of 1971 was amended to include an 8.49% increase in the posted price of oil. Additionally, the amended agreement further stipulated that every quarter the posting price would be adjusted based on an index that would be calculated by comparing value changes in the currencies of nine major industrialized countries relative to the dollar. However, this indexing arrangement was canceled after the 1973 oil crisis. The Tripoli Agreement of 1971 was signed by the OPEC members who exported across the Mediterranean, rather than through the Persian Gulf — namely Libya, Algeria and Iraq; not only did the posted price increase, but the profit sharing arrangement went from 50-50 to 55-45 in favor of the producing countries.

During the 1973 oil crisis, OPEC turned down an offer to increase the posted price by 15%, instead raising it from $3.00 to $5.11 per barrel. Arab oil producers also decided to cut production and embargoed the United States. Soon after, at a meeting in Tehran in January 1974, OPEC raised the posted price again — this time, to $11.65 per barrel. Between the start of the Arab-Israeli War of 1973 and the Tehran meeting the posted price of oil increased four-fold.

Between 1973 and 1980, the value of exports from Arab oil-producing countries increased from less than $23 billion to $220 billion. Saudi Arabia's exports rose from $8 billion to $108 billion in same time period. The oil-producing countries agreed to return to normal production levels in March 1974, and the price of crude oil "froze" until 1979. Although the posted price in 1978 was $12.70, after calculating for inflation and currency fluctuations, the real price of oil purchased with Japanese yen was $6.67 in 1978, compared to $9.56 in 1974.

A number of studies were published in the 1980s that attempted to show causality between OPEC's posted price and the market price of oil.

== Price fluctuation ==
The following table shows variations in the posted price and the revenue received by OPEC countries between 1964 and 1975 (in US dollars):

Date	Posted Price	Government revenues
June 1964	1.80	.99
June 1965	1.80	.99
June 1966	1.80	.99
June 1967	1.80	.99
June 1968	1.80	.99
June 1969	1.80	.99
June 1970	1.80	.99
June 1971	2.285	1.325
June 1972	2.479	1.448
June 1973	2.898	1.702
January 1974	11.651	7.008
March 1974	11.651	7.008
June 1974	11.651	7.008
September 1974	11.651	7.113
December 1974	11.251	9.799
March 1975	11.651	9.799
June 1975	11.651	9.799
