= Roy Spence (executive) =

American advertising executive

Roy Spence (born October 10, 1948) is the chairman and co-founder of the advertising agency GSD&M, and an author.

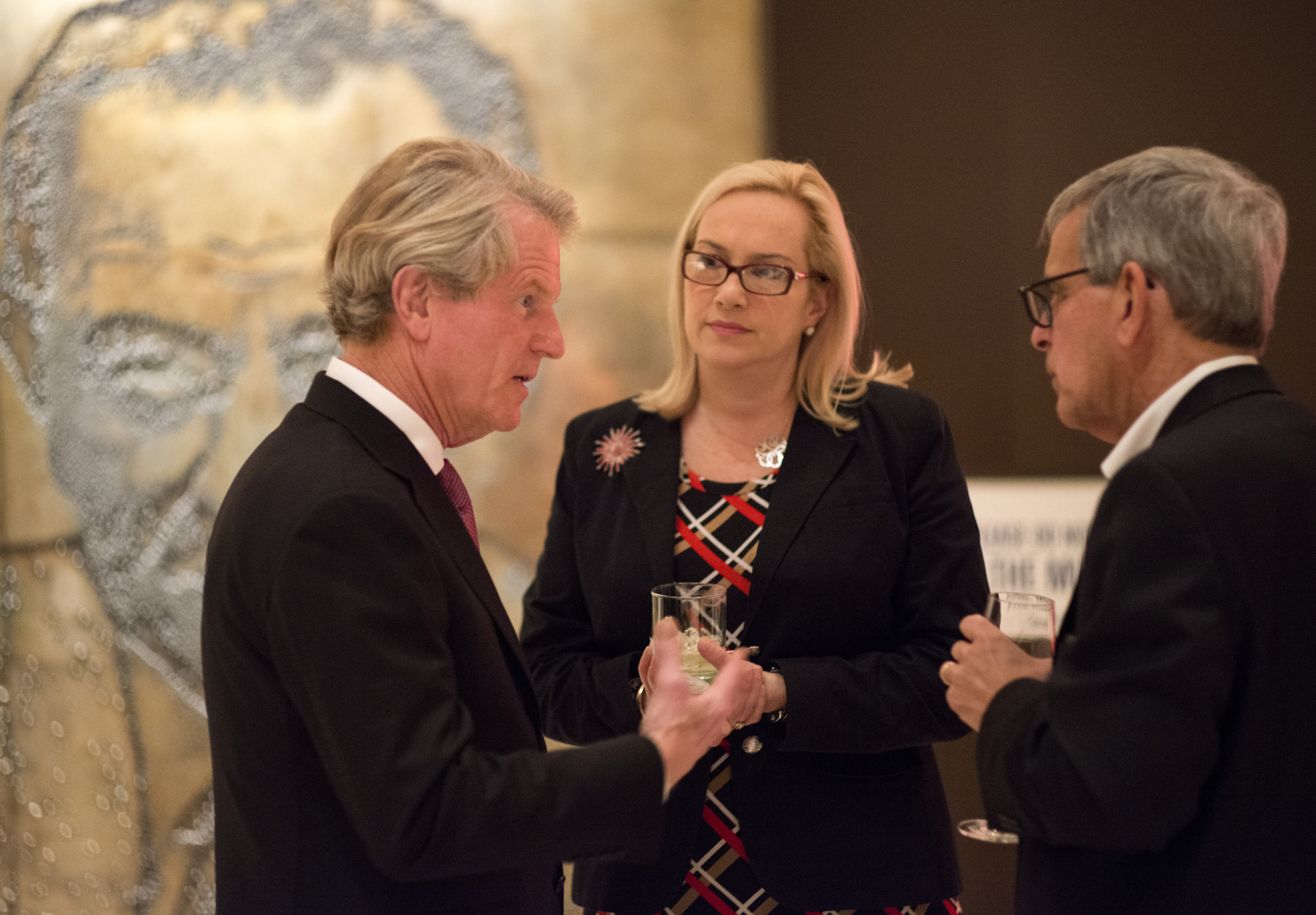
Spence (l)

== Early life ==
Spence was born in Brownwood, Texas, to Roy Milam Spence Sr. and Ruth Griffin. He attended Brownwood High School, where he was a member of the 1965 Class 3A state championship football team. He then went on to enroll at the University of Texas at Austin, and went on to found GSD&M in 1971.

== Awards ==
In 2004, Roy Spence received the Distinguished Alumnus Award from the University of Texas.

== Bibliography ==
- Spence, Roy; McClure, Tim (2006). Don't Mess with Texas: The Story Behind the Legend. Idea City Press. ISBN 978-0-9722825-1-2.
- Spence, Roy M. (2006). The Amazing Faith of Texas: Common Ground on Higher Ground. University of Texas Press. ISBN 978-0-292-72176-0.
- Spence Jr., Roy M.; Rushing, Haley (2009). It's Not What You Sell, It's What You Stand For: Why Every Extraordinary Business Is Driven by Purpose. Portfolio Hardcover. ISBN 978-1-59184-241-5.
