= GSD&M =

Advertising agency

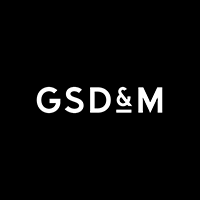
- Company type: Public
- Industry: Advertising
- Founded: 1971
- Headquarters: Austin, Texas, United States
- Number of employees: 400+
- Website: www.gsdm.com

GSD&M is an American advertising agency headquartered in Austin, Texas. It was founded in 1971 by graduates of University of Texas at Austin – Roy Spence, Judy Trabulsi, Tim McClure and Steve Gurasich, and others, as AdVantage Associates. After the 1972 political campaign for former Texas Senator Ralph Yarborough, it re-organized with the four principals, as GSD&M. Since 1998, GSD&M has been part of the Omnicom Group. A satellite office is located in Chicago, Illinois.

== History ==
The agency started with local retail accounts and expanded to more regional work. In 1986, the agency created the Don't Mess with Texas anti-litter slogan for the Texas Department of Transportation.

In the 1990s GSD&M began to acquire more national brands outside of Texas and was regarded as a "creative hot-shop". The agency relinquished Chili's, DreamWorks, Frito-Lay, Fannie Mae and UnitedHealthcare in 2006–2007. The agency's Omnicom sibling, BBDO, was given the lead on the AT&T account, although GSD&M still has a portion of the business. That loss eventually reduced the number of employees from a high of over 900 to fewer than 400.

The agency was known as GSD&M until August 27, 2007 when it changed its name to GSD&M's Idea City. "Idea City" was previously the name of the agency's Austin headquarters. The "Idea City" name was dropped from the firm name in January 2011.

On February 5, 2009, GSD&M founder Roy Spence published It's Not What You Sell, It's What You Stand For. The book, co-authored with Haley Rushing, is a business book that suggests the key to high-performing organizations is that they have a purpose. Purpose, according to the book, is defined as "a definitive statement about the difference you are trying to make in the world."

GSD&M uses "Purpose-based branding" in its approach to their clients.

In 2001, following the September 11 attacks, the firm created the public service announcement short film I am an American for the Ad Council.

In January 2016, Blue Bunny Ice Cream appointed GSD&M as its lead media partner.
