= Peter Grossman =

American economist

Peter Z. Grossman (born July 27, 1948) is the Clarence Efroymson Professor of Economics, now emeritus, at Butler University in Indianapolis, Indiana. He is the author of seven books, including a comprehensive history of American Express. He was a columnist for the Indianapolis Star from 2000 to 2007. Grossman earned his M.A. and Ph.D. from Washington University in St. Louis in 1990 and 1992, respectively, and his B.A. and M.F.A. degrees from Columbia University in 1970 and 1972, respectively.

== Bibliography ==
- In Came the Darkness: The Story of Blackouts, Four Winds Press, New York, 1981. ISBN 9780590076517.
- American Express: the Unofficial History of the People who Built the Great Financial Empire, Crown, New York, 1987. ISBN 978-0517562383
- Introduction to Energy: Resources, Technology and Society, Cambridge University Press, 1990, with E.S. Cassedy, 2nd printing 1993. 2nd Edition, 1998. 3rd Edition, 2017.
- The End of a Natural Monopoly: Deregulation and Competition in the Electric Power Industry, JAI Press, with Daniel H. Cole, 2003.
- How Cartels Endure and How They Fail: Studies of Industrial Collusion, Edward Elgar Publishing, 2004.
- Principles of Law and Economics, Prentice Hall, with Daniel H. Cole, 2005.
- U.S. Energy Policy and the Pursuit of Failure, Cambridge University Press, 2013. ISBN 978-1107005174
