= Mandatory Oil Import Quota Program =

US import restrictions program (1959–1973)

The Mandatory Oil Import Quota Program was a program of import restrictions on oil into the United States. Created in 1959 by Presidential Proclamation 3279 by President Dwight Eisenhower, the scheme was intended to prevent a dependence of the United States on imported petroleum supplies. From 1962, the maximum level of imports was set at 12.2% of domestic production.

The program was established after an investigation by the director of the Office of Civil and Defense Mobilization established that oil imports threatened to impair US national security.

The import quota was lifted in 1973 by President Richard Nixon.
