= Elias Lieberman =

American poet

Elias Lieberman (1883–1969) was an American poet, writer and educator, known for 1916 poem "I Am an American".

== Background ==
Elias Lieberman was born on October 30, 1883, in Saint Petersburg, Russia. At age seven, he emigrated to the United States with his Russian Jewish family. In 1903, he graduated cum laude from the City College of New York, where he joined the Phi Beta Kappa fraternity. In 1911, he earned a PhD from New York University.

== Career ==
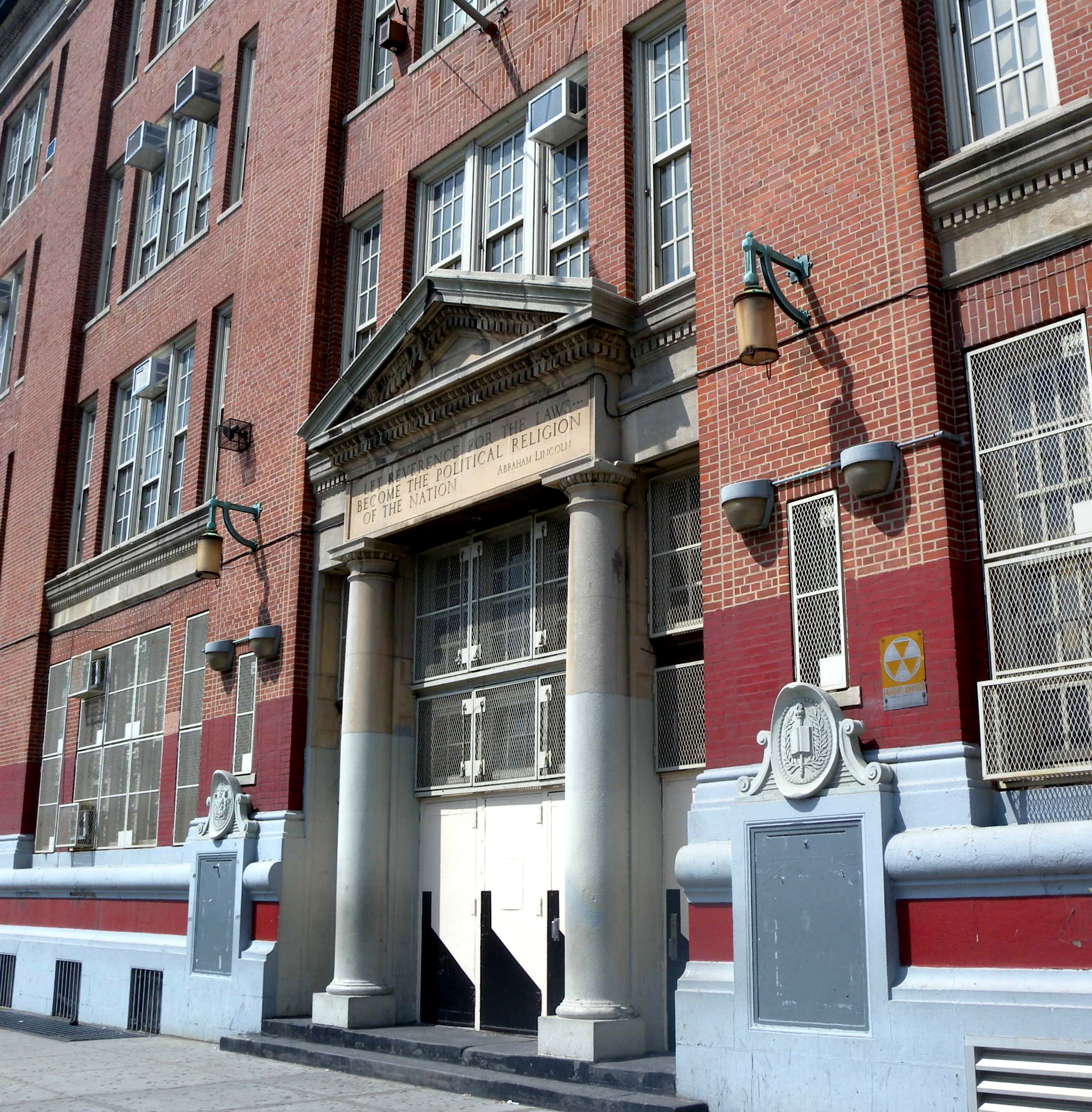
Thomas Jefferson High School, where Lieberman was principal from 1924 to 1940

In 1903, Lieberman began working as an English teacher at public schools. At NYU, he served as editor of Puck, The American Hebrew, and The Scholastic.

In 1918, he became head of the English department at Bushwick High School in Brooklyn, through 1924.

In 1924, Lieberman became principal of the new Thomas Jefferson High School in Brooklyn. Students included movie star and comedian Danny Kaye and wife Sylvia Fine, scientist Martin Pope, producer Jack Rollins, typewriter expert Martin Tytell, and historian Howard Zinn. Thomas Jefferson was one of seven public high schools in New York to receive a M. P. Moller pipe organ in 1926 under Lieberman. (In the 1990s, this organ was removed and discarded.)

In 1940, Lieberman joined the New York City Board of Education, as an associate superintendent of schools in charge of the junior high school division. He retired in 1954.

== Personal life and death ==
Lieberman married Rose Kiesler. Their two children became a surgeon and a professor.

In 1918, Arthur Guiterman and Joyce Kilmer nominated Lieberman to the Poetry Society of America. He later served there as director and vice president. In 1969, he became a fellow of the society.

He served as president of the Associate Alumni of City College.

Lieberman died age 85 on July 13, 1969, at his home in the Richmond Hill district in Queens, New York.

== Awards ==
- 1940: National Poetry Center gold medallion for Man in the Shadows
- 1953: Townsend Harris Medal for distinguished service as educator and author
- 1966: James Joyce Award of the Poetry Society of America for "Ballade of Heraclitean Flux"

== Works ==
Lieberman wrote poetry all his life. "I am an American" appeared in the July 1916 issue of Everybody's Magazine. He last published in the Alaska Review.

- 1903: "Lavender", alma mater song of CCNY
- 1916: "I Am an American" (poem)
- 1918: Paved Streets
- 1930: Hand Organ Man
- 1940: Man in the Shadows
- 1954: To My Brothers Everywhere
