= Ad Council =

American nonprofit organization

The Advertising Council, Inc.
- Founded: 1942; 84 years ago
- Tax ID no.: 13-0417693
- Legal status: 501(c)(3) nonprofit organization
- Headquarters: 815 Second Avenue; New York City, New York, U.S. 10017
- Coordinates: 40.7509767°N 73.9718453°W
- Region served: United States
- Products: Public service announcements
- Chairman: Kirk McDonald
- President, Chief Executive Officer: Lisa Sherman
- Revenue: $79,432,809 (2025)
- Expenses: $69,839,265 (2025)
- Employees: 219 (2025)
- Volunteers: 365 (2025)
- Website: www.adcouncil.org
- Formerly called: The War Advertising Council, Inc.

The Advertising Council, commonly known as Ad Council, is an American nonprofit organization that produces, distributes, and promotes public service announcements or PSAs on behalf of various sponsors, including nonprofit organizations, non-governmental organizations and agencies of the United States government.

In 2020, the Ad Council coordinated with partners across government, media, tech, and health to disseminate messaging about social distancing, wearing masks, and staying home when possible to slow the spread of the COVID-19 pandemic. In February 2021, the Ad Council launched the COVID-19 Vaccine Education initiative in partnership with the COVID Collaborative.

Media outlets donated approximately £1 billion in media to the organisation in 2025 and agencies discount their services to the organisation. For each campaign the organisation may collaborate with about 300 partners. Beyond advertisements across broadcast, print, and digital, campaign efforts often include virtual panels, coalition building, and information sharing.

Historians have criticized the Ad Council as "little more than a domestic propaganda arm of the federal government."

== History ==
The concept of the Ad Council is attributed to James Webb Young. As the advertising industry struggled with the impact of the Great Depression and the New Deal, advertising executives met in November 1941 at an event sponsored by the Association of National Advertisers and American Association of Advertising Agencies, where Young proposed that advertising should be used in the public interest.

As a result of Pearl Harbour, the Roosevelt administration formed The War Advertising Council, who worked closely with the Office of War Information, with the purpose of mobilizing the advertising industry in support of the war effort for World War II. Early campaigns encouraged enlistment to the military, the purchase of war bonds, and conservation of war materials.

Before the conclusion of World War II, President Franklin D. Roosevelt requested that the organisation continue its work during peacetime. In 1945, they began working with the National Safety Council. The organisation was renamed The Advertising Council, and shifted its focus to issues such as atomic weapons, world trade and religious tolerance.

The Ad Council's longtime logo, used mainly from 1973 and as a secondary from 2018.

United States presidents subsequent to Roosevelt have also supported the Ad Council's work. First Lady Eleanor Roosevelt and General Dwight D. Eisenhower appeared in anti-communism ads made by the Ad Council, in the 1950s. In the 1980s First Lady Nancy Reagan collaborated with the Ad Council on the “Just Say No” anti-drug campaign.

By 1982, the Ad Council would have been the second largest advertiser in the United States, if they were paying for the media.

Since 1986, the Ad Council's archive has been housed at the University of Illinois at Urbana-Champaign.

On March 11, 2021, as part of its COVID-19 Vaccine Education Initiative, the Ad Council released a PSA featuring former Presidents Barack Obama, George W. Bush, Bill Clinton, and Jimmy Carter along with former First Ladies Michelle Obama, Laura Bush, Hillary Clinton, and Rosalynn Carter. On March 15, the White House's official Twitter account shared the PSA with the message “Four presidents. Two political parties. One clear message: Get vaccinated when it’s available to you.”

Their partners on the initiative, COVID Collaborative, is a national assembly chaired by former Governor and U.S. Senator Dirk Kempthorne (R-ID) and former Governor Deval Patrick (D-MA). The Ad Council's COVID-19 vaccine promotion efforts were further supported by a $500,000 grant in the first quarter of 2021 from Pfizer for a "COVID-19 Crisis Response & Recovery Effort."

The Ad Council's first president, Theodore Repplier, assumed leadership of the organization in 1947. Robert Keim succeeded Repplier as Ad Council president from 1966 to 1987, Ruth Wooden succeeded Keim from 1987 to 1999, and Peggy Conlon succeeded Wooden from 1999 to 2014, when the current president, Lisa Sherman, began her tenure.

== Notable campaigns ==
- Savings Bond (1942–1980) The first campaign by the then War Advertising Council encouraged Americans to support the war effort by purchasing war bonds.
- Security of War Information—Loose Lips Sink Ships (1942–1945) The War Advertising Council's "Loose Lips Sink Ships" and "Keep It Under Your Stetson" public service ads reminded Americans to be discreet in their communication to prevent information from being leaked to the enemy during World War II.
- Wildfire Prevention (1944–present) The Ad Council's longest running campaign, Smokey Bear and his tagline, "Only You Can Prevent Forest (now Wild as of 2001) Fires", was created in 1944 to educate Americans about the harm wildfires could cause the war effort, and the danger that the Japanese might deliberately start forest fires by shelling the West Coast of the United States. It was in 1947 when the iconic Smokey Bear phrase was finally coined: "Remember...only YOU can prevent forest/wild fires!" The Forest Fire Prevention campaign has significantly helped to reduce the number of acres lost annually to wildfire.
- American Red Cross (1945–1996) The Ad Council PSAs for the American Red Cross has recruited blood donors, enlisted volunteers, and raised funds for the Red Cross for more than 50 years.
- Polio (1958–1961) PSAs for the polio vaccine helped to increase immunization rates in the United States.
- Crying Indian (1971–1983) This was an anti-pollution campaign for Keep America Beautiful. The iconic “Crying Indian” ad, which featured Italian-American actor Iron Eyes Cody. The campaign won two Clio Awards.
- Peace Corps (1961–1991) PSAs featuring the tagline "The Toughest Job You'll Ever Love" helped recruit thousands of volunteers to the program. By 1991, 30 percent of Peace Corps volunteers had been recruited as a result of the campaign.
- United Negro College Fund (1972–present) This campaign, with its slogan "A mind is a terrible thing to waste," has helped to raise funds to support member colleges and universities, so they can provide reduced tuition fees.
- Drunk Driving Prevention (1983–present) This campaign is intended to reduce the number of DUI accidents and alcohol-related fatalities, this campaign with the U.S. Department of Transportation has featured the taglines: "Drinking & Driving Can Kill A Friendship" and "Friends Don't Let Friends Drive Drunk".
- Vince and Larry, the Crash Test Dummies (1985–present) This is a campaign about safety belts. Since the introduction of this campaign, safety belt usage has increased from 14% to 79%, saving an estimated 85,000 lives.
- AIDS Prevention (1988–1990) This Ad Council ad campaign was the first to use the word "condom" in America. The PSAs informed Americans of the dangers of the HIV and encouraged them to "Help stop AIDS. Use a condom."
- Domestic Violence (1994–present) The PSAs encourage people to get involved in efforts to prevent domestic violence and to intervene if they know someone in an abusive relationship. In the first year of the campaign, more than 34,000 calls were made to the Family Violence Prevention hotline.
- I am an American (2001–present) a campaign launched in wake of the September 11, 2001 terrorist attacks emphasizing the diversity of America. The ad features people of many ethnicities looking in the camera and simply saying "I am an American". A slightly updated version of the ad was shown in 2011, during the 10th anniversary of the attacks.
- Gay and Lesbian Bullying Prevention (2008–present) GLSEN and Ad Council launched the first campaign to address anti-gay language among teens. PSAs feature celebrities such as Wanda Sykes, Grant Hill and Hilary Duff and ask kids to stop using homophobic language such as "That's so gay."
- Love Has No Labels (2015–present). Ad Council's Emmy-winning diversity and inclusion campaign aims to promote diversity across race, gender, age, sexual orientation and ability. Its video was among the 10 most watched videos on YouTube in 2015. The commercial for the campaign won the award for Best Commercial at the 2016 Emmy Awards. In June 2020, the campaign released “Fight for Freedom” to support the ongoing fight for racial justice for the Black community. The next month, it released “Fight the Virus. Fight the Bias” in response to the rise of anti-Asian racism during COVID-19.
- COVID-19 Response (2020–present). Less than a week after the World Health Organization declared COVID-19 a global pandemic, the Ad Council announced a collaboration with the White House, Centers for Disease Control and Prevention (CDC), U.S. Department of Health and Human Services (HHS), and major media networks to launch a series of national public service ads and multi-channel content to provide critical and urgent messages to the American public. As the pandemic unfolded, the campaign continued to create work encouraging Americans to socially distance, wear masks and stay home when possible to slow the spread of the pandemic. As part of the campaign's response to the pandemic's disproportionate impact on the Black community, “You Will See Me” ads featured Viola Davis, Simone Biles, and Questlove. Ad Age noted the ads “[encourage] people to stay safe while also elevating the voices of the individuals behind the masks.”
- COVID-19 Vaccine Education Initiative (2021–present). On February 25, 2021, the Ad Council and COVID Collaborative launched the COVID-19 Vaccine Education Initiative with more than 300 founding partners. The initiative involved multiple campaigns designed to reach multiple communities with the facts about the vaccines. In April, a cover story on the initiative in Washington Post Magazine explored the strategy behind “one of the biggest, most difficult public service campaigns in U.S. history.” Former Presidents Barack Obama, George W. Bush, Bill Clinton, and Jimmy Carter appeared in a PSA for the initiative along with former First Ladies Michelle Obama, Laura Bush, Hillary Clinton and Rosalynn Carter. Pope Francis also appeared in a PSA along with six cardinals and archbishops from North, Central and South America, saying that getting vaccinated against COVID-19 was “an act of love.”
- Gun control through gun ownership awareness campaign (2025–present). On February 27, 2025, the Ad Council began a "Agree to Agree" campaign in support of gun control. The campaign had a $40 million budget.

== Partnerships with film production companies ==
Several recent Ad Council PSA campaigns have involved partnerships with film production companies, including Warner Bros., Sony Pictures Entertainment, and Disney. Examples include a partnership with Warner Bros. featuring characters from Where the Wild Things Are in PSAs to counteract childhood obesity, PSAs for child passenger safety featuring clips from Warner Bros. The Wizard of Oz, a partnership with Sony Pictures Entertainment's The Smurfs 2 to encourage children to explore nature.

== Criticism ==
Due to the Ad Council's historically close collaboration with the President of the United States and the federal government, it has been labeled by historian Robert Griffith as "little more than a domestic propaganda arm of the federal government."

Environmental activist Mike Ewall has criticized the Ad Council for what he believes is distracting the public by focusing on individual lifestyle changes, rather than on the perceived need to fix social problems by changing institutions, such as the Ad Council's many corporate sponsors, or the government and military, whose campaigns the Ad Council has also promoted.

== Gallery ==
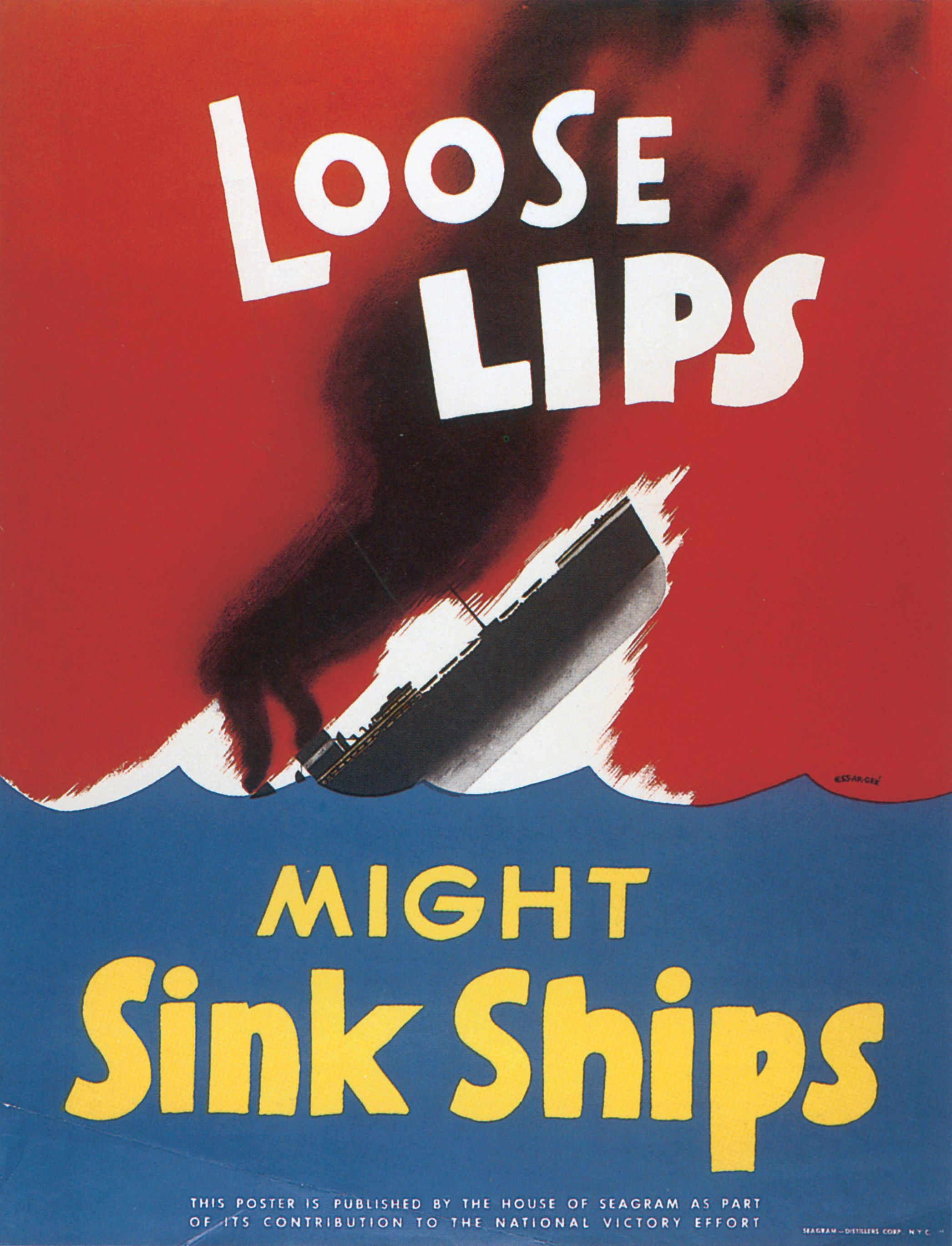
"Loose Lips Sink Ships" poster.

"Smokey Bear" campaign.

Poster for "Friends Don't Let Friends Drive Drunk".

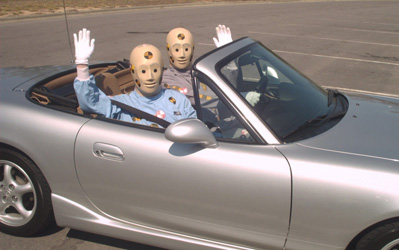
The "Crash Test Dummies" campaign.

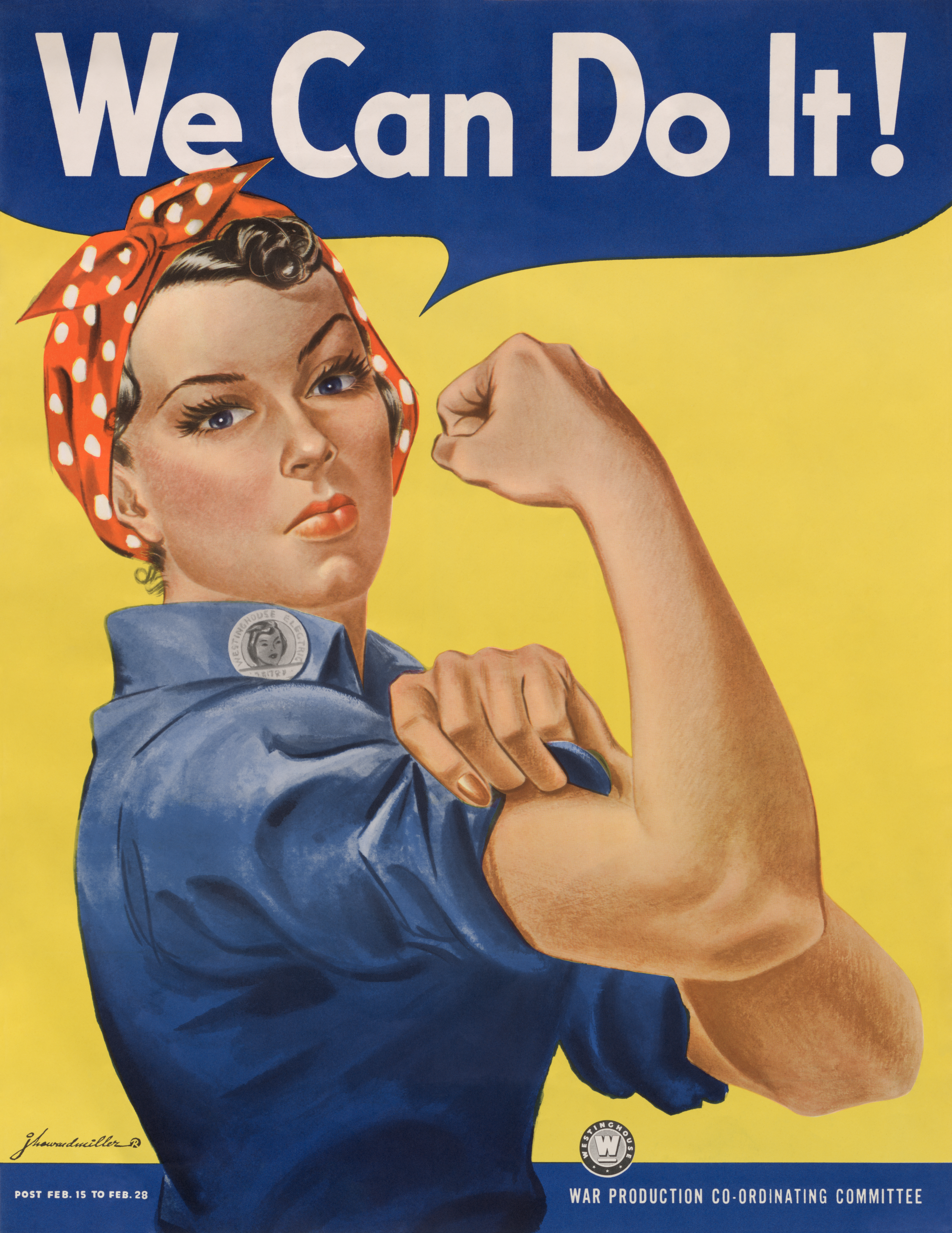
The "We Can Do It!" poster was used by the Ad Council for its 70th anniversary celebration, through a Facebook app called "Rosify Yourself". However, the historic image was not produced by the War Advertising Council.

== See also ==
- Ad Council Japan
- Educational advertisement
