= Free World =

Propaganda term used to refer to the Western Bloc

The "Free World" is a propaganda term, primarily used during the Second World War, as well as the Cold War, to refer to the Allies, the Western Bloc, and aligned countries. It has traditionally primarily been used to refer to the countries allied and aligned with the United States, the European Union, and NATO. The term "leader of the free world" has been used to imply a symbolic and moral leadership, and was mostly used during the Cold War in reference to the president of the United States. During the Second World War, the term was primarily used against fascist states. During the Cold War, the term referred more broadly to all liberal democracies collectively, as opposed to Communist states.

== History of the concept ==
=== Origins ===
The term "Free World" emerged in the political discourse of the United States in May 1940, following Germany's attack on Belgium, the Netherlands, and France during World War II. It denoted all democracies that resisted authoritarian and world revolutionary states such as Germany, Italy, Japan, and the Soviet Union. In June 1941, U.S. President Franklin D. Roosevelt explicitly used the term when urging Congress to approve military aid. However, following the United States' entry alongside the Soviet Union in the war, Roosevelt used the term primarily in reference to the United Nations in opposition against Germany, Italy, and Japan.

In the years that followed the war, particularly during the Cold War, the "Free World" came to encompass a bloc of democracies, such as the United States and many Western European nations, along with their anti-communist but authoritarian allies. In 1950, U.S. Representative Daniel J. Flood commented "[The staff of Assistant Secretary of State for Public Affairs Edward W. Barrett] used the phrase 'free world' all the time—the free world, the free world, the free world. That impressed me very much vis-à-vis the Communist world, for instance. It is a tremendously good propaganda term. Is it being plugged enough?"

During the Cold War, many neutral countries—either those in what is considered the Third World, or those having no formal alliance with either the United States or the Soviet Union—viewed the claim of "Free World" leadership by the United States as grandiose and illegitimate.

=== 21st century usage ===
While "Free World" had its origins in the Cold War, the phrase is still used after the end of the Cold War and during the Global War on Terrorism. Samuel P. Huntington said the term has been replaced by the concept of the international community, which, he argued, "has become the euphemistic collective noun (replacing "the Free World") to give global legitimacy to actions reflecting the interests of the United States and other Western powers."

== Leadership of the Free World ==
=== United States ===
George H. W. Bush, the president of the United States during the Fall of Communism

The "Leader of the Free World" was a colloquialism, first used during the Cold War, to describe either the United States or, more commonly, the president of the United States. The term when used in this context suggested that the United States was the principal democratic superpower, and the U.S. president was by extension the leader of the world's democratic states, i.e. the "Free World".

But remember, we have differences with our allies all over the world. They are family differences, and sometimes they are acute, but, by and large, the reason we call it "free world" is because each nation in it wants to remain independent under its own government and not under some dictatorial form of government.

— Dwight D. Eisenhower (to the Associated Press, 1 October), The Los Angeles Times, 2 October 1958

The phrase has its origin in the 1940s during the Second World War, especially through the anti-fascist Free World magazine and the American propaganda film series Why We Fight. At this time, the term was criticized for including the Soviet Union (USSR), which critics saw as a totalitarian dictatorship. However, the term became more widely used against the USSR and its allies during the 1950s in the wake of the Truman Doctrine, when the United States depicted a foreign policy based on a struggle between "a democratic alliance and a communist realm set on world domination", according to the American magazine The Atlantic. The term here was criticized again for including right-wing dictatorships such as Francoist Spain, and Nikita Khrushchev said in the 21st Congress of the Soviet Communist Party that "the so-called free world constitutes the kingdom of the dollar".

Although in decline after the mid-1970s, the term was heavily referenced in US foreign policy up until the dissolution of the Soviet Union in December 1991. After the presidency of George H. W. Bush the term has largely fallen out of use, in part for its usage in rhetoric critical of U.S. foreign policy. In the late 2010s and into the 2020s, the term was still being used to describe the United States, its president, and as part of rhetoric critical of the president and U.S. policies.

=== European Union ===
On 6 May 2010, upon an address to the plenary chamber of the European Parliament, the then US Vice President Joe Biden, stated that Brussels had a "legitimate claim" to the title of "capital of the free world", normally a title reserved for Washington. He added that Brussels is a "great city which boasts 1,000 years of history and serves as capital of Belgium, the home of many of the institutions of the European Union and the headquarters of the NATO alliance."

=== Germany ===
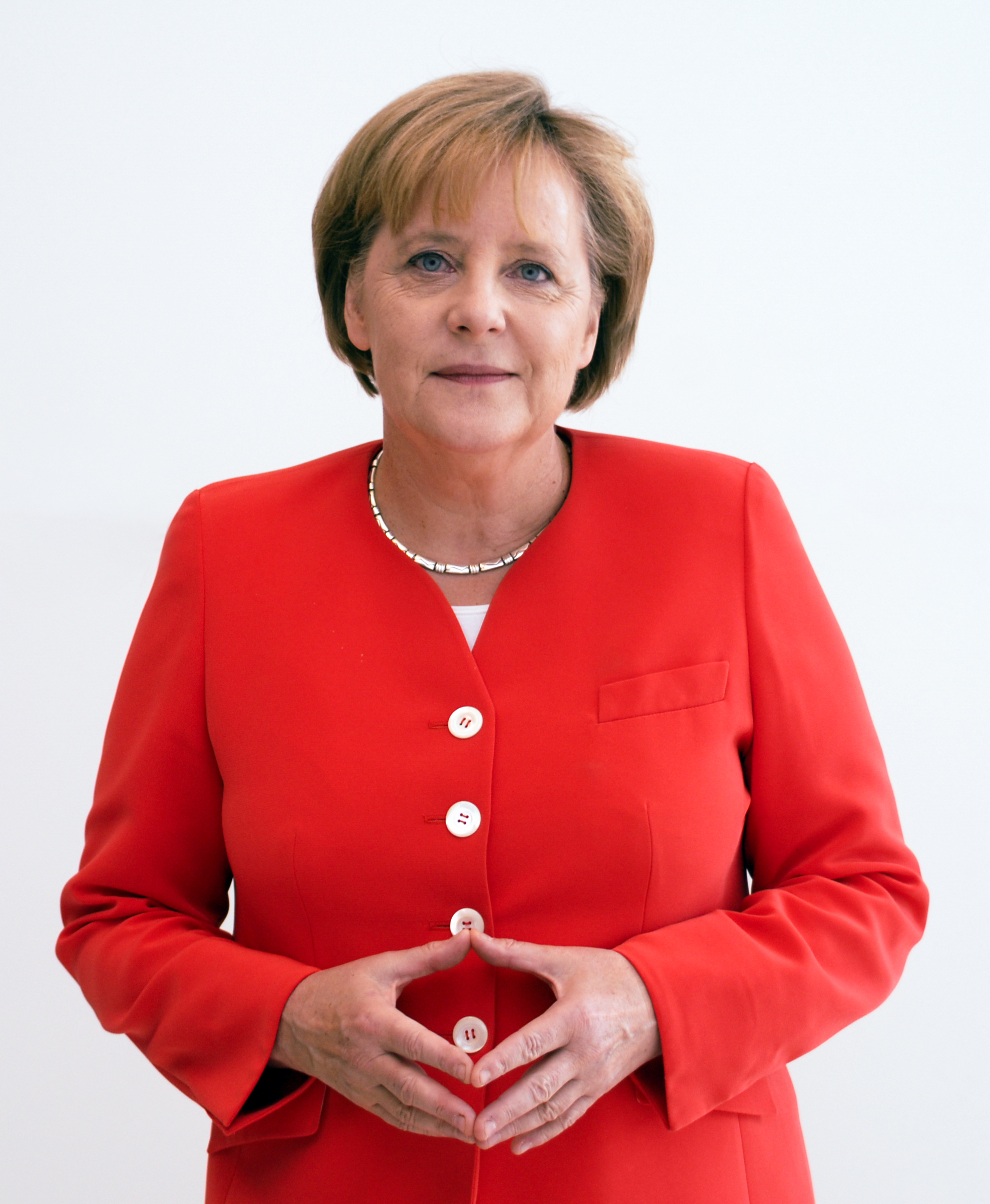
Angela Merkel served as the Chancellor of Germany from 2005 to 2021.

When Time declared German Chancellor Angela Merkel as the Time Person of the Year for 2015, it referred to her as "Europe's most powerful leader", and the cover bore the title "Chancellor of the Free World". Following the election of Donald Trump to the US presidency in November 2016, The New York Times called Merkel "the Liberal West's Last Defender", and a number of commentators called her "the next leader of the free world". Merkel herself rejected the description. An article by James Rubin in Politico about a White House meeting between Merkel and Trump was ironically titled "The Leader of the Free World Meets Donald Trump".

German commentators agreed with Merkel's assessment, and Friedrich Merz, a CDU politician, said that a German chancellor could never be "leader of the free world". In April 2017, columnist James Kirchick stressed the importance of the German elections (on which "the future of the free world" depended) since America had "abdicated its traditional role as leader of the free world by electing Trump, the United Kingdom was turning inward after the referendum decision to leave the European Union, and France was also traditionally unilateralist and now had an inexperienced president"; he called Merkel "something less than leader of the free world ... but something greater than the leader of just another random country". References to America's abdication of its role as leader of the free world continued or increased after Trump questioned the unconditional defence of NATO partners and the Paris climate accord.

Jagoda Marinić, writing for The New York Times, noted that "Barack Obama all but literally passed on the mantle of 'leader of the free world' to Ms. Merkel (and not Mr. Trump), and most Germans feel empowered by that new responsibility" and that Germany "is coming to understand its role in standing up for liberal democracy in a world turning more and more authoritarian."

Other commentators—in the United States and Europe—rejected the appellation "Leader of the Free World". Some argued that there is no single leader of the "free world", while others queried whether Merkel remained the "leader of the free world" and the champion of liberal values. Questioned about Merkel's standing following her performance in the 2017 German federal election, former US Secretary of State Hillary Clinton opined that Merkel was "the most important leader in the free world".

After Merkel's party suffered losses in the 2017 election and there were delays in forming a government, the claim that Merkel is the true leader of the free world was referred to as a "joke", described as a media phenomenon, and otherwise called into question. When Merkel retired as chancellor, Clinton wrote that "she led Europe through difficult times with steadiness and bravery, and for four long years, she was the leader of the free world."

== See also ==
- Annuit cœptis
- "Axis of evil"
- CRINK
- Berlin Wall speech
- Carthago delenda est
- Death to America
- Death to Arabs
- Death to Israel
- E pluribus unum
- Evil Empire speech
- Freedom in the World
- Free World Military Assistance Forces
- "Global arrogance"
- Gott strafe England
- "Great Satan"
- "I Want YOU for U. S. Army"
- In God We Trust
- Make America Great Again
- Novus ordo seclorum
- "Outposts of tyranny"
