= U.S. seal =

U.S. seal may refer to:

- Great Seal of the United States
- A United States Navy SEAL
