= William Barton (heraldist) =

American lawyer and scholar

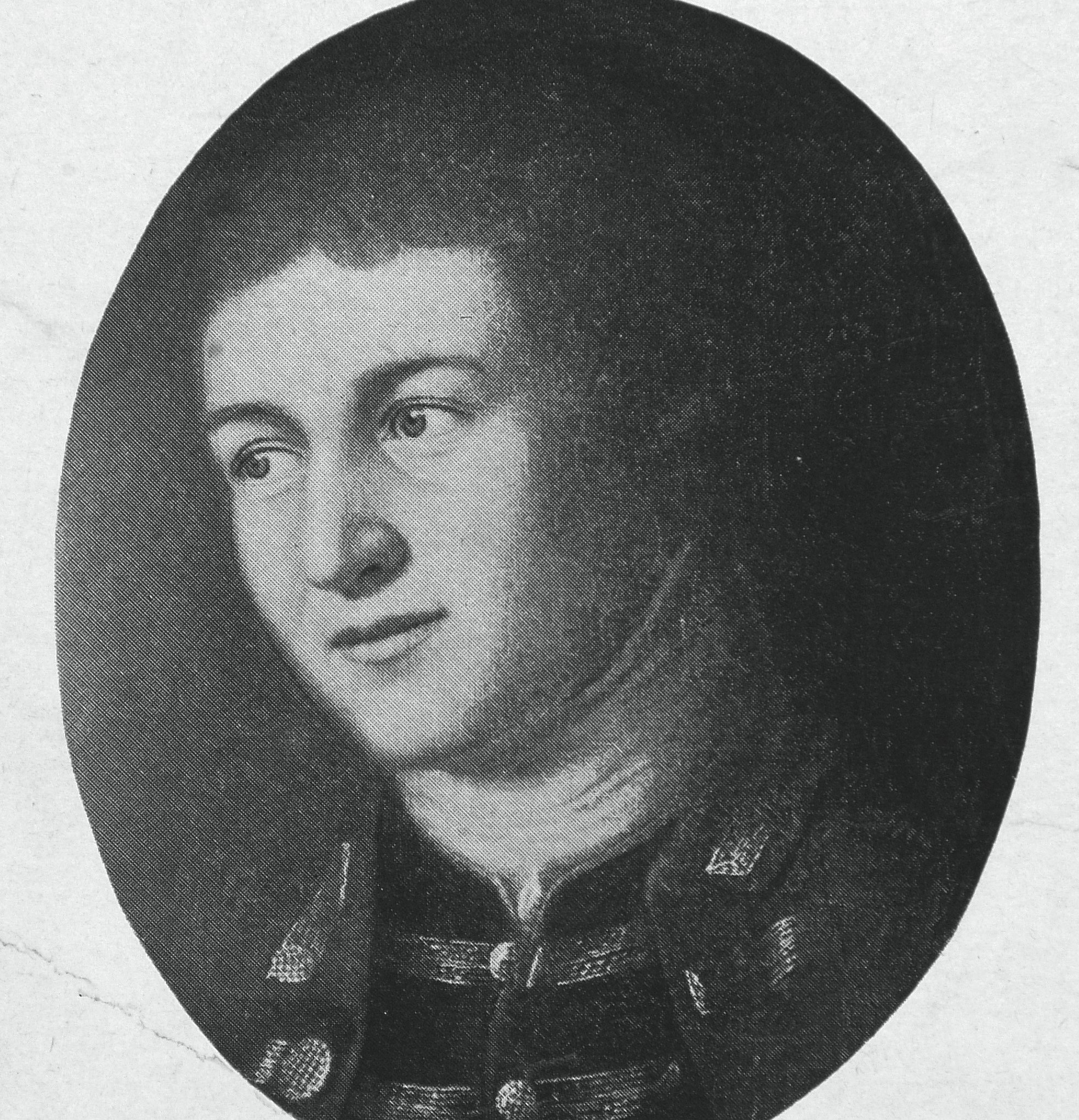
- William Barton, from a Charles Willson Peale painting
- Born: April 11, 1754; Philadelphia, Province of Pennsylvania
- Died: October 21, 1817 (aged 63); Lancaster, Pennsylvania, United States
- Occupations: Lawyer, Scholar
- Known for: Designing the Great Seal of the United States (with Charles Thomson)
- Spouse: Elizabeth Rhea
- Children: 9 (including William P.C. Barton)
- Relatives: David Rittenhouse (uncle)

William Barton (April 11, 1754 – October 21, 1817) was a Pennsylvania lawyer, scholar, and the designer (with Charles Thomson) of the Great Seal of the United States.

== Early years ==
Barton was born April 11, 1754, in Philadelphia, in the Province of Pennsylvania. His father, Rev. Thomas Barton, was an Irish immigrant from Carrickmacross who had opened a school near Norristown, Pennsylvania in 1751. His mother was Esther Rittenhouse, sister of astronomer David Rittenhouse, for whom William would later write a biography. William's brother, Benjamin, would later become known for his work as a botanist.

William grew up in Lancaster, Pennsylvania. In 1775, with the American War of Independence underway, he went to England, where he studied heraldry. During his time in Europe, he also met some of his maternal relatives in the Netherlands.

He returned to Pennsylvania in 1779 and was admitted to the bar of the Supreme Court of Pennsylvania, setting up a practice in Philadelphia. In 1781, he married Elizabeth Rhea, niece of Continental Congressman Jonathan Bayard Smith. They had five daughters and four sons, including botanist William P.C. Barton.

It was also in 1781 that Barton published Observations on the Nature and Use of Paper Credit. The same year, the University of Pennsylvania awarded him an honorary Master of Arts degree, and in 1785, the College of New Jersey (later known as Princeton University) followed suit. In 1786, Barton published The True Interests of the United States and particularly of Pennsylvania Considered with Respect to the Advantages Resulting from a State Paper Money.

== The Great Seal ==
In May 1782, Barton, who had a reputation for his knowledge of heraldry, was consulted by the Third Great Seal Committee to contribute to the design of a national coat-of-arms for the United States. He drafted what he called Device for an Armorial Achievement for the United States of North America, blazoned agreeably to the Laws of Heraldry.

He introduced an eagle with wings "displayed," an element that Secretary of the Continental Congress Charles Thomson greatly emphasized in the final proposal. The new design for the reverse of the seal incorporated the Eye of Providence atop a pyramid of thirteen steps. This combined the influence of Pierre Eugene du Simitiere, who had included the Eye of Providence in his designs for the First Great Seal Committee, with that of Francis Hopkinson, who had consulted for the Second Great Seal Committee, and who had included a similar pyramid in his 1778 design for the Continental Currency. On June 20, the design, as amended and expanded by Thomson, was adopted by the Continental Congress.

On the subject of heraldry, Barton wrote a 1788 letter to General George Washington:

"I am likewise persuaded, Sir, that Blazonry not only merits the notice of an inquisitive Mind, viewed merely as a speculative science; but, that Coat-Armour, the Object of it, maybe rendered conducive to both public and private cases, of considerable importance, in this infant nation, now rising into greatness:"

In 1789, Washington (who had meanwhile been elected President) nominated Barton as a Judge of the Western Territory. Barton declined the appointment.

== Later publications ==
In 1787, Barton was elected to Benjamin Franklin's American Philosophical Society. In 1791, his uncle, David Rittenhouse, became the Society's second president, after Franklin's death in 1790.

By 1798, William moved back to Lancaster, and ran in Pennsylvania's 7th congressional district that year as the Democratic-Republican nominee, overwhelmingly losing to incumbent John W. Kittera. In 1802, he published a lengthy treatise entitled A Dissertation on the Freedom of Navigation and Maritime Commerce, and such Rights of States Relative Thereto, as are founded on the Law of Nations. He dedicated this work to Thomas Jefferson, who was the President of the United States at the time, as well as the president of the American Philosophical Society.

In 1813, he published Memoirs of the Life of David Rittenhouse. Jefferson had already subscribed for six copies. Former President John Adams, who received a copy of the book from Barton, wrote in an 1814 letter to Jefferson:

"Mrs. Adams reads it with great delight and reads to me what she finds interesting, and that is, indeed, the whole book. I have not time to hear it all."

Barton was elected a member of the American Antiquarian Society in 1814.

Barton proposed an ambitious series of biographies, to be published in three volumes a year under the title, Select American Biography, Or, An Account of the Lives of Persons, Connected by Nativity, or Otherwise With the History of North America, Since the First Discovery of that Country. He described his intention for this project:

"not only to concentrate in one point of view the lives of men distinguished in the New World, of whom some notices are already published; but also to rescue from oblivion the merits of many characters of worth, related in various ways to this country, of whom no public record has yet appeared."

He died in Lancaster on October 21, 1817, before the project could be realized.

== Sources ==
- A Memoir of the Life of William Barton, A.M.
- Barton's report on his design for the Great Seal
