= Annuit cœptis =

Motto on the reverse of the Great Seal of the United States

Annuit cœptis (/ˈænuɪt ˈsɛptɪs/, Classical Latin: [ˈannʊ.ɪt ˈkoe̯ptiːs]) is one of two mottos on the reverse side of the Great Seal of the United States, designed by Charles Thomson, then secretary of the Continental Congress, and William Barton. The literal translation is "[He] favors (or "has favored") [our] undertakings", from Latin annuo ("I approve, I favor"), and coeptum ("commencement, undertaking"). Because of its context as a caption above the Eye of Providence, the standard translations are "Providence favors our undertakings" and "Providence has favored our undertakings."

The reverse side of the Great Seal of the United States

== On the Great Seal ==
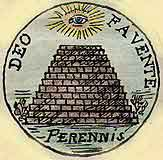
William Barton's design with Deo Favente and Perennis

Barton explained that the motto alluded to the Eye of Providence: "Deo favente which alludes to the Eye in the Arms, meant for the Eye of Providence." In western art, God is traditionally represented by the Eye of Providence, which principally symbolizes God's omniscience. In 1782, Samuel Adams appointed a design artist, William Barton of Philadelphia, to bring a proposal for the national seal. For the reverse, Barton suggested a 13-layered pyramid underneath the Eye of Providence. The mottos which Barton chose to accompany the design were Deo Favente ("with God's favor", or more literally, "with God favoring") and Perennis ("Everlasting"). The pyramid and Perennis motto had come from a $50 Continental currency bill designed by Francis Hopkinson. (Note: The note can be seen here, and the pyramid portion here.)

== Change from Deo Favente to Annuit Cœptis ==
When designing the final version of the Great Seal, Charles Thomson (a former Latin teacher) kept the pyramid and eye for the reverse side but replaced the two mottos, using Annuit Cœptis instead of Deo Favente and Novus ordo seclorum instead of Perennis. When he provided his official explanation of the meaning of this motto, he wrote:

The pyramid signifies Strength and Duration: The Eye over it & the Motto allude to the many signal interpositions of providence in favour of the American cause.

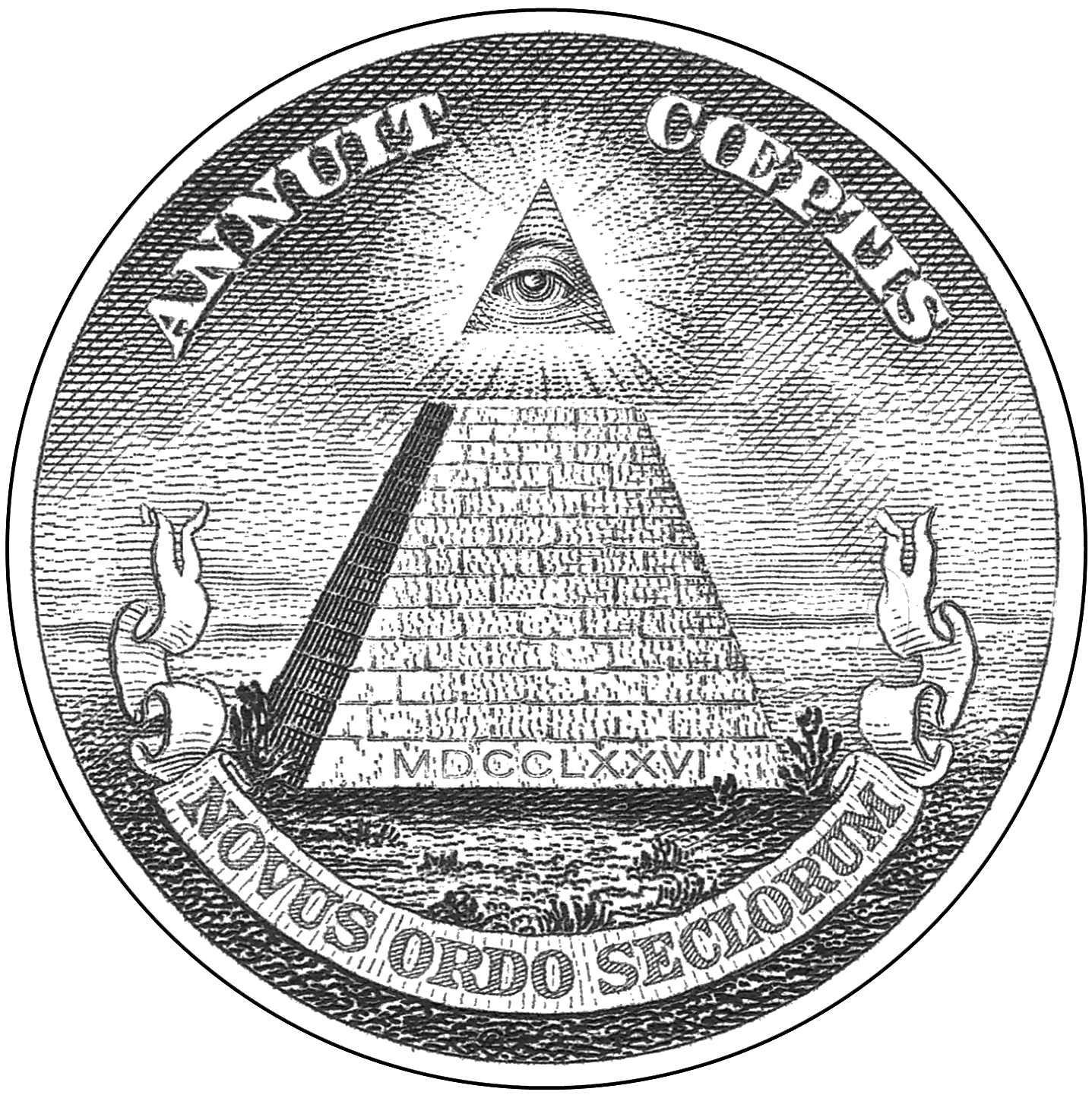
Reverse monochrome detail

Annuit Cœptis is translated by the U.S. State Department, the U.S. Mint, and the U.S. Treasury as, "He [God] has favored our undertakings" (brackets in original). However, the original Latin does not explicitly state who (or what) is the subject of the sentence.

A 2024 publication in the Associated Gospel Churches Journal explores the question as to whether Annuit Coeptis makes reference to God, examining the claim that the founders of the United States were deliberate to avoid references to God by choosing only secular mottos.

== Classical source of the motto ==
According to Richard S. Patterson and Richardson Dougall, Annuit cœptis (meaning "He favours our undertakings") and the other motto on the reverse of the Great Seal, Novus ordo seclorum (meaning "new order of the ages"), can both be traced to lines by the Roman poet Virgil. Annuit cœptis comes from the Aeneid, book IX, line 625, which reads "Iuppiter omnipotens, audacibus adnue coeptis" ("Jupiter Almighty, favour [my] bold undertakings"). It is a prayer by Ascanius, the son of the hero of the story, Aeneas, just before slaying an enemy warrior, Numanus.

The same language also occurred in an earlier poem of Virgil, the Georgics. In line I.40 of that work is the phrase "da facilem cursum atque audacibus annue cœptis". The line is addressed to Caesar Augustus and translates to "give [us] an easy path and nod at our audacious undertakings".

== See also ==
- Novus ordo seclorum
- E pluribus unum
- Eye of Providence
- List of Latin phrases
- List of national mottos
- List of U.S. state and territory mottos
- United States national motto
