= Novus ordo seclorum =

Mottos that appear on the reverse of the Great Seal of the United States

Reverse side of the Great Seal of the United States

The phrase Novus ordo seclorum (English: /ˈnoʊvəs ˈɔːrdoʊ sɛˈklɔːrəm/, Latin: [ˈnɔwʊs ˈoːrdoː seːˈkloːrũː]; "New order of the ages") is one of two Latin mottos on the reverse side of the Great Seal of the United States. The other motto is Annuit cœptis. The mottos were coined by Charles Thomson, the secretary of the Congress of the Confederation.

Thomson derived the phrase Novus ordo seclorum from a poem by the Roman poet Virgil. He wrote that the phrase signified "the beginning of the New American Era" as of the date of the Declaration of Independence in 1776, which was depicted in Roman numerals at the base of the pyramid on the seal.

== Origin ==
The phrase derives from the fourth poem of the Eclogues by the Latin poet Virgil. The fourth eclogue contains the passage (lines 4–10):

Ultima Cumaei venit iam carminis aetas:
magnus ab integro saeclorum nascitur ordo.
Iam redit et Virgo, redeunt Saturnia regna:
iam nova progenies caelo demittitur alto.
Tu modo nascenti puero, quo ferrea primum
desinet, ac toto surget gens aurea mundo,
casta fave Lucina; tuus iam regnat Apollo.

Translation:

Now is come the last age of the Cumaean prophecy:
the great cycle of ages is born anew.
Now returns the Maid, returns the reign of Saturn:
now from high heaven a new generation comes down.
Yet do thou at that boy's birth, in whom the iron age shall begin to cease,
and the golden to arise over all the world,
holy Lucina, be gracious; now thine own Apollo reigns.

The motto is specifically a rephrasing of the second line: "Magnus ab integro saeclorum nascitur ordo" (The great cycle of ages is born anew).

== Meaning ==
The forms saecla, saeclorum etc. were normal alternatives to the more common saecula etc. throughout the history of Latin poetry and prose. The form saeculorum is impossible in hexameter verse: the ae and o are long, the u short by position.

The word seclorum does not mean "secular", but is the genitive (possessive) plural form of the word saeculum, meaning (in this context) generation, century, or age. Saeculum did come to mean "age, world" in late, Christian Latin, and "secular" is derived from it, through secularis. However, the adjective "secularis," meaning "worldly," is not equivalent to the genitive plural "seclorum," meaning "of the ages."

The motto Novus ordo seclorum was translated and added to the seal by Charles Thomson, a Latin expert who was involved in the design of the Great Seal, as "A new order of the ages." Thomson said it was to signify "the beginning of the new American Era" as of the date of the Declaration of Independence in 1776, which was depicted in Roman numerals at the base of the pyramid on the seal.

== See also ==
- Annuit cœptis
- E pluribus unum
- Eye of Providence
- List of Latin phrases
- List of national mottos
- List of U.S. state and territory mottos
- United States national motto
