= Pierre Eugene du Simitiere =

American artist (1737–1784)

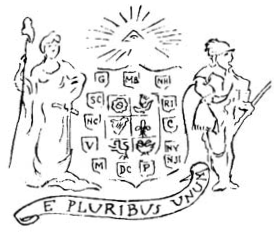
Original design for the Great Seal of the United States, by Simitiere (1776), including the Eye of Providence and his suggested national motto E pluribus unum

Raising the Liberty Pole in New York City, 1770 pen and ink drawing by Simitiere depicting one of six liberty poles to be alternately raised and later removed over ten years in confrontations among the Sons of Liberty and British troops stationed in the city prior to the American Revolutionary War.

Pierre Eugene du Simitiere (born Pierre-Eugène Ducimetière, French: [pjɛʁ øʒɛn dysimtjɛʁ]; 18 September 1737 – October 1784) was a Genevan-born American member of the American Philosophical Society, naturalist, American patriot, and portrait painter.

Du Simitiere served as the artistic consultant for the committees that designed the Great Seal of the United States, and submitted the first proposed design to include the Eye of Providence and suggested the adoption of the U.S. motto E pluribus unum ("Out of Many, One").

== Biography ==
Born in Geneva, du Simitiere's original name was Pierre-Eugène Ducimetière or Pierre-Eugène du Cimetière. After leaving the Republic of Geneva, he spent more than a decade in the West Indies before moving to New York and then Philadelphia. He spelled his name Pierre-Eugène du Simitière, Pierre Eugene du Simitiere, or du Symitiere after settling in Philadelphia. Elected to the American Philosophical Society in 1768, he further became one of its curators (1777–1781).

Du Simitiere served as the artistic consultant for the committees that designed the Great Seal of the United States, and in 1776 he submitted the first proposed design to include the Eye of Providence, which element was eventually adopted. Moreover, he suggested the adoption of the U.S. motto E pluribus unum ("Out of Many, One"). He also designed the Seal of New Jersey, the Seal of Delaware, and a Great Seal for Georgia, although Georgia did not adopt his design.

In 1779, du Simitiere painted the first known portrait of George Washington, later used for the 1791 one-cent coin. During the early Revolution, he drew portraits of many American military and political leaders, including Friedrich Wilhelm von Steuben, John Jay, William Henry Drayton, John Dickinson, Benedict Arnold, among others, all of which were published in a 1783 book. In 1781, he was conferred an honorary degree from Princeton University (which was still called College of New Jersey until 1896). In the early 1780s, Thomas Jefferson's daughter Martha took drawing lessons with du Simitiere.

Du Simitiere was the translator into French for the Letters to the Inhabitants of Canada from the Continental Congress designed to draw the new British subjects of Quebec into the American Revolutionary War.

During his lifetime, du Simitiere was well known for his interest in natural history, which included every facet of the field. He was a prolific collector of knowledge, particularly published works ranging from pamphlets to books, which eventually included the history of the Thirteen Colonies and the beginnings of the American Revolution. As an artist, Du Simitiere showed great range and talent from designing seals to drawing maps to the visual portraits of Revolutionary leadership. He combined his love of history with his great capacity to create and collect material with a vision of founding the first American museum. Du Simitiere opened this museum, filled with natural history and other gathered items from his collections, in 1782.

When du Simitiere died two years later in 1784, the Library Company of Philadelphia purchased the manuscript and broadsides in the museum's collection at auction. Although du Simitiere was well regarded by the American elite in the 1770s and 1780s, he frequently struggled in his finances in the years before his death. He is buried in St Peter’s Church in Philadelphia. Within a century, the location of his grave was no longer known, with one observer stating that du Simitiere's "last resting place in St. Peter's Church yard is unmarked and forgotten." His legacy was cemented by the 1870s as a man of "considerable artistic talent" with a "wandering spirit," a great vision for design, and a passion for collecting natural and political history.

== Other events ==
=== First American museum of natural history ===
He created the first American museum of natural history from his personal collections constituted during his travels and through his purchases. He opened it to the public in 1782, four years before Charles Willson Peale's Philadelphia Museum, which is generally considered the first American public museum of natural history.

=== First coin auction sale in North America ===
His coin collection was the first record in Early North American history to serve as collateral on a loan granted to him by William Dilwyn. This collection later on was sold at public auction by Matthew Clarkson and Ebenezer Hazard, on March 19, 1785 at Philadelphia. Included in the sale as Lot #19 was "A Mahogany cabinet containing ancient and modern Gold, Silver, and Copper Coins and Medals." This sale precedes all sales in Atinelli's Numisgraphics by 43 years and is considered to be the first known coin auction sale in America. An advertisement for this sale reposes in the Archives of the Library Company of Philadelphia.

=== Acknowledgement by the Founding Fathers of the United States ===
On August 14, 1776, in a letter to his wife Abigail Adams about designing the Great Seal of the United States, John Adams wrote about Pierre Eugene du Simitiere, both his vision and his collections:

There is a Gentleman here of French Extraction, whose Name is Du simitiere, a Painter by Profession whose Designs are very ingenious, and his Drawings well executed. He has been applied to for his Advice. I waited on him yesterday, and saw his Sketches. For the Medal he proposes Liberty with her Spear and Pileus, leaning on General Washington. The British Fleet in Boston Harbour, with all their Sterns towards the Town, the American Troops, marching in.2 For the Seal he proposes. The Arms of the several Nations from whence America has been peopled, as English, Scotch, Irish, Dutch, German &c. each in a Shield. On one side of them Liberty, with her Pileus, on the other a Rifler, in his Uniform, with his Rifled Gun in one Hand, and his Tomahauk, in the other. This Dress and these Troops with this Kind of Armour, being peculiar to America—unless the Dress was known to the Romans. Dr. Franklin shewed me, yesterday, a Book, containing an Account of the Dresses of all the Roman Soldiers, one of which, appeared exactly like it. This Mr. Du simitiere is a very curious Man. He has begun a Collection of Materials for an History of this Revolution. He begins with the first Advices of the Tea Ships. He cutts out of the Newspapers, every Scrap of Intelligence, and every Piece of Speculation, and pastes it upon clean Paper, arranging them under the Head of the State to which they belong and intends to bind them up in Volumes. He has a List of every Speculation and Pamphlet concerning Independence, and another of those concerning Forms of Government.

After du Simitiere's death, on March 8, 1785, George Washington responded to a letter by Reverend William Gordon (1728-1807), who in his goal to write a history of the American Revolution, had requested a portrait of Washington:

If Du Simitiere is living, and at Philadelphia, it is possible he may have miniature engravings of most if not all the military characters you want, and in their proper dresses. He drew many good likenesses from the life, and got them engraved at Paris for sale. Among these I have seen that of General Gates, Baron Steuben, and others, as also of your humble servant.
