= 1812 in literature =

This article contains information about the literary events and publications of 1812.

== Events ==
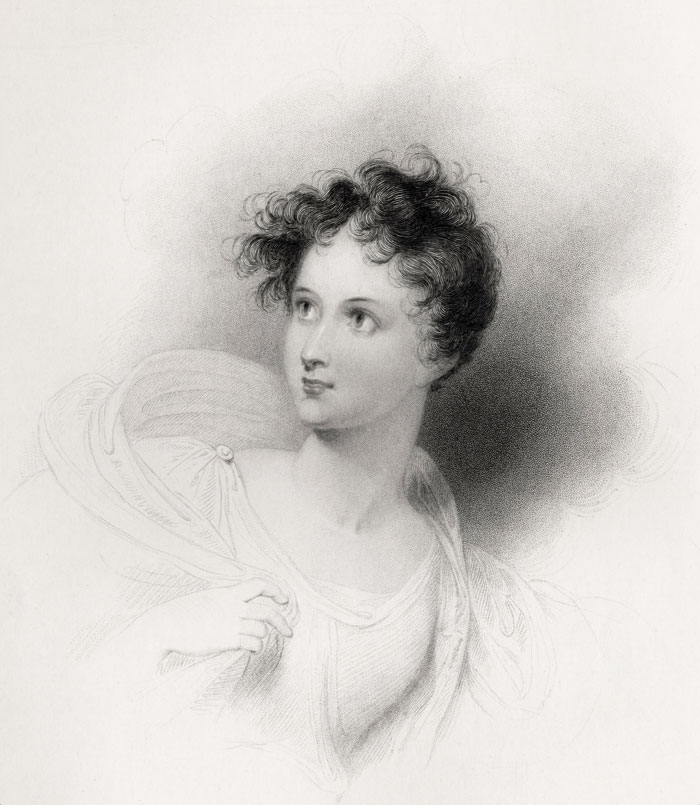
Lady Charlotte Harley, the dedicatee of Childe Harold's Pilgrimage under the name Ianthe

- January 2 – Samuel Taylor Coleridge's lecture on Hamlet is given as part of a series of lectures on drama and William Shakespeare; it has influenced Hamlet studies ever since.
- March 20 – The first two cantos of Lord Byron's poem Childe Harold's Pilgrimage are published in London by John Murray. This sells out in five days, giving rise to Byron's comment "I awoke one morning and found myself famous."
- May–July – The library of John Ker, 3rd Duke of Roxburghe (died 1804) is auctioned in London. On June 17 a presumed first edition of Giovanni Boccaccio's Decameron, printed by Christophorus Valdarfer of Venice in 1471, is sold to the Marquis of Blandford for £2,260, the highest price ever given for a book at that time. This is followed by a social meeting of bibliophiles under the chairmanship of 2nd Earl Spencer, the origin of the Roxburghe Club. The club is formed by Thomas Frognall Dibdin, author of the book Bibliomania; or Book-Madness (1809), who serves as its first secretary, and formalised under Earl Spencer's presidency.
- June 24–December 14 – The French invasion of Russia will form the climax of Leo Tolstoy's 1869 novel War and Peace and be depicted several other works of literature. The plot of Tolstoy's historical novel is set 55 years before its date of composition, but Tolstoy will speak with people who lived through the French invasion of Russia, and read all the standard histories available in Russian and French about the Napoleonic Wars as well as letters, journals, autobiographies, and biographies of Napoleon and other key players of that era. There are approximately 160 real persons named or referred to in War and Peace. Tolstoy will work from primary source materials, such as interviews and other documents, as well as from history books, philosophy texts, and other historical novels. Tolstoy will also use a great deal of his own experience in the Crimean War (1853–1856) to bring vivid detail and first-hand accounts of how the Imperial Russian Army is structured.
- October 10 – The rebuilt Theatre Royal, Drury Lane in London opens. The new building for the theatre was designed by Benjamin Dean Wyatt on behalf of the committee led by the brewer Samuel Whitbread. The theatre opens tonight with a production of Hamlet featuring Robert William Elliston in the title role of Prince Hamlet. The new theatre makes some concessions toward intimacy, seating 3,060 people, about 550 fewer than the earlier building (though this size is still considered an extremely large theatre). On September 6, 1817, gas lighting is extended from the audience area to the stage, making it the first British theatre to be gaslit throughout. In 1820, the portico that still stands at the theatre's front entrance on Catherine Street is added, and in 1822 the interior undergoes a significant remodelling. The colonnade running down the Russell Street side of the building is added in 1831.
- December 9–20 – Leigh Hunt is tried and convicted of libel for calling the Prince Regent "a violator of his word, a libertine over head and ears in debt and disgrace" in The Examiner on March 22.
- December 26 – Novelist Frederick Marryat is promoted to lieutenant after distinguished service at sea in the War of 1812.

== New books ==
=== Fiction ===
- Sarah Burney – Traits of Nature
- Maria Edgeworth:
  - The Absentee
  - Emilie de Coulanges
  - Vivian
- Jean-Baptiste Benoît Eyriès – Fantasmagoriana
- The Brothers Grimm – Grimm's Fairy Tales, volume 1 (Kinder- und Hausmärchen)
- Ann Hatton – The Fortress del Vechii
- Frances Margaretta Jacson (misascribed to Mary Brunton) – Things by their Right Names
- Charles Maturin – The Milesian Chief
- Rebecca Rush – Kelroy
- George Soane – The Eve of San Marco
- Louisa Stanhope – The Confessional of Valombre
- Elizabeth Thomas – The Vindictive Spirit
- Jane West – The Loyalists: An Historical Novel

=== Children and young people ===
- Barbara Hofland – The History of a Clergyman's Widow and Her Young Family
- Johann David Wyss – The Swiss Family Robinson

=== Drama ===
- Joanna Baillie – Orra
- Theodor Körner
  - Die Braut (The Bride)
  - Der grüne Domino (The Green Domino)
  - Der Nachtwächter (The Night Watchman)
  - Zriny
- Adam Oehlenschläger – Stærkodder
- August von Kotzebue – Der arme Poet (The Poor Poet)

=== Poetry ===
- Anna Laetitia Barbauld – Eighteen Hundred and Eleven
- Lord Byron – Childe Harold's Pilgrimage
- Percy Bysshe Shelley – The Devil's Walk: A Ballad
- James and Horace Smith (anonymously) – Rejected Addresses
- William Tennant – Anster Fair

=== Non-fiction ===
- John Galt – Cursory Reflections on Political and Commercial Topics
- Georg Wilhelm Friedrich Hegel – Die objektive Logik
- Sir Richard Colt Hoare – The Ancient History of South Wiltshire
- Mirza Abu Taleb Khan – Masir Talib fi Bilad Afranji (The Travels of Taleb in the Regions of Europe)
- James Maitland, 8th Earl of Lauderdale – The Depreciation of the Paper-currency of Great Britain Proved
- John Nichols – The Literary Anecdotes of the 18th Century, volume 1
- Percy Bysshe Shelley – Declaration of Rights

== Births ==
- February 7 – Charles Dickens, English novelist and editor (died 1870)
- February 15 – Chandos Wren-Hoskyns (Chandos Hoskyns), English agricultural author and landowner (died 1876)
- February 19 – Zygmunt Krasiński, Polish poet (died 1859)
- May 7 – Robert Browning, English poet (died 1889)
- May 12 – Edward Lear, English nonsense poet, caricaturist and painter (died 1888)
- June 9 – Camilla Dufour Crosland, English writer and poet (died 1895)
- June 18 – Ivan Goncharov, Russian novelist and critic (died 1891)
- June 27 – Andrei Mocioni, Hungarian/Romanian journalist and literary patron (died 1880)
- July 5 – Antonio García Gutiérrez, Spanish dramatist (died 1884)
- August 22 – Geraldine Jewsbury, English novelist and woman of letters (died 1880)
- September 16 – Anna Louisa Geertruida Bosboom-Toussaint, Dutch novelist (died 1886)
- October 29 – Louise Granberg, Swedish playwright (died 1907)
- December 3 – Hendrik Conscience, Flemish novelist (died 1883)
- December 10 – Caroline M. Sawyer, American poet, writer, and editor (died 1894)
- December 23 – Samuel Smiles, Scottish self-help author (died 1904)
- unknown date
  - Louis du Couret, French explorer, military officer, and writer (died 1867)
  - Mohan Lal Kashmiri, Indian traveller and writer (died 1877)

== Deaths ==
- February 13 – Jacques Marie Boutet, French dramatist and actor (born 1745)
- February 24 – Hugo Kołłątaj, Polish historian and philosopher (born 1750)
- March 18 – John Horne Tooke, English controversialist and cleric (born 1736)
- March 24 – Johann Jakob Griesbach, German Biblical commentator (born 1745)
- May 12 – Martha Ballard, American diarist (born c. 1734)
- July 14 – Christian Gottlob Heyne, German librarian and classicist (born 1729)
- October 28 – Susanna Duncombe, English poet and painter (born 1725)
- November 11 – Platon Levshin, Russian church historian (born 1737)
- November 16 – John Walter, English founder of The Times, London (born c. 1738)
- December 22 – Pierre Henri Larcher, French classicist and archeologist (born 1726)
- unknown date – Zalkind Hourwitz, Polish essayist (born 1738)

== Sources ==
- Thomson, Peter (1995). "Drury Lane, Theatre Royal". In Banham, Martin (ed.). The Cambridge Guide to Theatre. Cambridge University Press. pp. 309–311. ISBN 978-0-521-43437-9.
