= Jane Aitken =

American printer (1764–1832)

Jane Aitken (1764–1832) was an American printer and publisher known for printing Charles Thomson's translation of the Septuagint into English, as well as Rebecca Rush's novel Kelroy. She was the first printer to issue a Philadelphia census directory containing a section devoted to "persons of colour".

Some of her papers are held in the collections of one of her clients, the American Philosophical Society.

== See also ==
- Thomson's Translation
