= Jacob Rush (jurist) =

Pennsylvania jurist, brother of Dr. Benjamin Rush (1747–1820)

Jacob Rush (1746/47–1820) was an American jurist.

== Life ==
Jacob Rush, brother of Benjamin Rush, was born near Philadelphia, perhaps in Byberry Township, Pennsylvania, about December, 1746, or January, 1747. He was graduated at Princeton in 1765, settled in the practice of law in Philadelphia, was a judge of the High Court of Errors and Appeals of Pennsylvania in 1784–1806, president of the Court of Common Pleas of Philadelphia in 1806–20, and at an earlier date was a justice of the Supreme Court of Pennsylvania.

In the controversy between Joseph Reed and John Dickinson as to the character of Benedict Arnold, Judge Rush espoused the latter's cause, defending Arnold against the charges of Reed in 1779. Princeton gave him the degree LL.D. in 1804. He died in Philadelphia on January 5, 1820.

== Works ==
His publications include:

1. Resolve in Committee Chamber 6 Dec., 1774 (Philadelphia, 1774);
2. Charges on Moral and Religious Subjects (1803);
3. Character of Christ (1806);
4. Christian Baptism (1819).

His daughter, Rebecca, published Kelroy, a novel (Philadelphia, 1812).
