= The Arts Academy at Benjamin Rush =

Coordinates: 40.082816°N 74.974393°W

Location
- 11081 Knights Road; Philadelphia, Pennsylvania 19154; United States

Information
- Type: Public, Magnet, Art
- Established: 2008
- School district: The School District of Philadelphia
- Principal: Latoyia K. Bailey
- Teaching staff: 26.12 (FTE)
- Grades: 9-12
  - Grade 9: 183
  - Grade 10: 148
  - Grade 11: 147
  - Grade 12: 149
- Student to teacher ratio: 18:8
- Campus: Urban
- Colors: Purple, Black
- Mascot: Knight

The Arts Academy at Benjamin Rush (also known as Benjamin Rush, Rush Arts, colloquially referred to as Rush ) is a public, magnet high school located in Philadelphia, Pennsylvania. The school is named after American founding father Benjamin Rush. After a 2 year conversion from a middle school Rush Arts opened in 2008 as a performing arts magnet High School. It typically has about 630 students each year with roughly 500 females and 130 males. School ranking services tend to rank it in the top ten of Philadelphia schools.

== Performing Arts program ==
Students enrolled at Rush Arts enter having auditioned for their preferred concentration. Audition processes typically constitute two phases, the main one being a live performance and/or portfolio review overseen by department leads. Exceptions are made for extreme or special cases. Students are permitted to switch their major on the condition that they audition for the track and join the incoming cohort.

Students have the choice of five concentrations, referred to as majors. These include Visual Arts, Dance, Theatre, Vocal, and Instrumental. After ninth grade, Visual Arts students are allowed to alternate or focus on 3 separate tracks, Fine Arts, Graphic Design and Photography, Instrumental students have lessons specific to their chosen instrument.

== Athletics ==
The school competes in the Philadelphia Public League which is a part of PIAA District XII. The school mascot is the knight, while the team colors are purple and black. Its main athletics webpage is https://rushartsknights.org/

Rush Arts offers 7 Varsity sports for girls and 2 Varsity sports for boys. The sports offered to girls are volleyball, soccer, field hockey, basketball, and softball and flag football. The boys sports are basketball and bowling. This unbalanced offering of sports is due to the make up of the school population which is approximately 66% female.

In addition, due to the low number of males at the school, the school is involved in cooperative partnerships with George Washington High School for boys soccer, football, Wrestling, Volleyball and Lacrosse and a cooperative partnership with Swenson high school for Baseball and all students may compete as independent athletes for the Philadelphia Public League is sports like Tennis, Golf, Cross Country, Swimming and Track and Field.

Furthermore, there are several intramural sports that occur before school, during advisory and after school to help further the opportunity for sports participation including basketball, badminton, soccer, volleyball, football, hockey and ultimate frisbee.

== Extracurricular activities ==
Rush Arts offers various teacher and student lead clubs, programs and activities. These change based on student interest each year.
