= Thomas Fuller (mental calculator) =

Enslaved African-American man with exceptional mathematical skills

- Born: c. 1710; African continent (around present-day Liberia and Benin)
- Died: December 1790 (aged 79–80); Alexandria, Virginia, U.S.

Thomas Fuller (1710 – December 1790), also known as "Negro Demus" and the "Virginia Calculator", was an enslaved African renowned for his mathematical abilities.

== History ==
Born on the African continent, likely somewhere between present-day Liberia and Benin, Fuller was kidnapped and shipped to America in 1724, at the age of 14. He became enslaved by Elizabeth Cox of Alexandria, Virginia. Despite his mathematical skill, Fuller was illiterate. Ethnomathematics researcher Ron Eglash theorizes that Fuller may have been Bassari, comparing his abilities to their mathematical traditions. Before colonialism, the Bassari used to have "specialists who were trained in the memorization of sums".

Stories of his mathematical achievements spread through the East Coast of the United States and reached as far as France and Germany, becoming fuel for the abolitionist movement.

== Documentation of abilities ==
When Fuller was about 70 years old, William Hartshorne and Samuel Coates, members of the Pennsylvania Abolition Society (PAS), heard about Fuller's "extraordinary powers in arithmetic." The pair stopped their travels to investigate Fuller. Benjamin Rush, physician and Founding Father, had sought proof of Black intelligence, through the lens of "scientific achievement", to bolster antislavery causes. Through his membership in PAS, Rush was acquainted with Hartshorne and Coates and reported on their interview of Fuller in the Columbian Magazine. In this report, Rush stressed the credibility of Hartshorne and Coates. Rush retold how Hartshorne and Coates tested Fuller's mathematical abilities as follows:

First. Upon being asked, how many seconds there are in a year and a half, he answered in about two minutes, 47,304,000.

Second. On being asked how many seconds a man has lived, who is seventy years, seventeen days and twelve hours old, he answered, in a minute and a half, 2,210,500,800.

One of the gentlemen, who employed himself with his pen in making these calculations, told him he was wrong, and that the sum was not so great as he had said-upon which the old man hastily replied, "top, massa, you forget de leap year." On adding the seconds of the leap years to the others, the amount of the whole in both their sums agreed exactly.

Third. The following question was then proposed to him: suppose a farmer has six sows, and each sow has six female pigs, the first year, and they all increase in the same proportion, to the end of eight years, how many sows will the farmer then have? In ten minutes, he answered, 34,588,806. The difference of time between his answering this, and the two former questions, was occasioned by a trifling mistake he made from a misapprehension of the question.

Despite Fuller's perfect answers, it appeared to Hartshorne and Coates that his mental abilities must have once been more extraordinary. Rush wrote:

He was grey-headed, and exhibited several other marks of the weakness of old age. He had worked hard upon a farm during the whole of life but had never been intemperate in the use of spirituous liquors. He spoke with great respect of his mistress, and mentioned in a particular manner his obligations to her for refusing to sell him, which she had been tempted to by offers of large sums of money from several persons. One of the gentlemen, Mr. Coates, having remarked in his presence that it was a pity he had not an education equal to his genius, he said, "No, Massa, it is best I had no learning, for many learned men be great fools."

The only other "independent original" source documenting Fuller's abilities besides Rush is Fuller's obituary. Fuller's obituary, published anonymously in the Columbian Centinel in 1790, tells how he could mentally calculate correct answers to complicated questions faster than people calculating by hand could. It also reported minor details of his life. The obituary went on to say, "Had his opportunity of improvement been equal to those of thousands of his fellow-men, neither the Royal Society of London, the Academy of Sciences at Paris, nor even a Newton himself, need have been ashamed to acknowledge him a Brother in Science".

== Influence on abolitionist movement ==
Due to Rush's involvement in the abolitionist movement, the London-based Society for Effecting the Abolition of the Slave Trade reached out to him for "accounts of mental improvement" of Black people so they could counter those who said they were inferior. Along with information about Fuller, Rush shared the story of a Black doctor he knew personally, James Derham. Testimony of Fuller's abilities spread beyond American periodicals. French revolutionaries Jacques Pierre Brissot and Henri Grégoire wrote of Fuller as an example of why Black people should have equal rights. Brissot stated, "These instances prove, without a doubt that the capacity of the negroes may be extended to anything; that they have only need of instruction and liberty".
