= Thomson's Translation =

English translation of the Septuagint

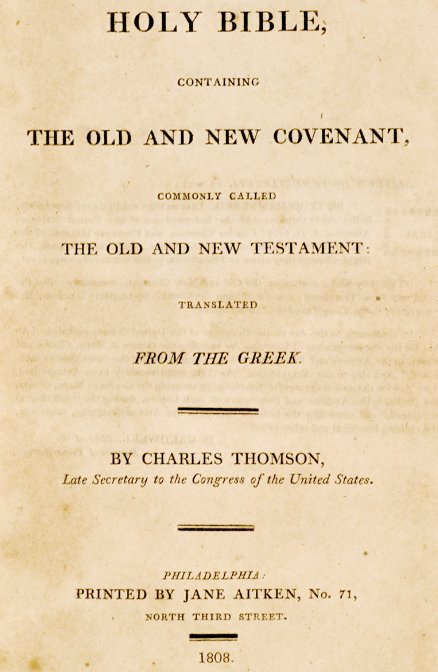
Thomson translation of the Bible

Thomson's Translation of the Bible is a direct translation of the Greek Septuagint version of the Old Testament into English, rare for its time. It took Charles Thomson, the secretary of the Continental Congress from 1774 to 1789 and a Founding Father of the United States, 19 years to complete, and was originally published in 1808.

== History ==
Thomson is credited with having created the work with little to no help from other scholars. Thomson was a Greek scholar, and before the American Revolution, he had been a teacher at several prominent schools. Thomson's translation of the entire Greek Bible, excluding the Apocrypha, was published in one thousand sets of four volumes each, the fourth volume being Thomson's translation of the New Testament in that same year. The printer was Jane Aitken of Philadelphia.

Thomson's was the first English translation of the Septuagint published and was considered by British biblical scholars to represent the best in American scholarship. David Daniell, in his compendious work The Bible in English (2003), states that the scholars who worked on the 1881 Revised Version consulted Thomson's translations (among others, of course) during their work. Thomson's translation of the New Testament is the first translation into English that was accomplished in America.

Thomson's personal copy, containing final corrections to the manuscript, is in the Philadelphia library. Thomson also published a Synopsis of the Four Evangelists in 1815, a book which came out of the notes for this work.
