= Benjamin Rush =

American Founding Father, physician, educator (1746–1813)

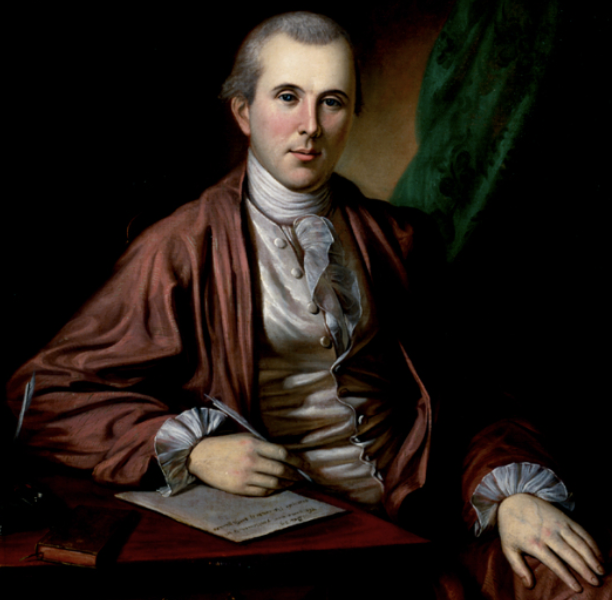
- Portrait, by Charles Willson Peale, c. 1783

Treasurer of the United States Mint
- In office November 24, 1797 – April 19, 1813
- Appointed by: John Adams
- Preceded by: Nicholas Way
- Succeeded by: James Rush

Delegate from Pennsylvania to the Pennsylvania Convention for Ratifying the Constitution of the United States
- In office November 21, 1787 – December 12, 1787
- Preceded by: Position established
- Succeeded by: Position abolished

Surgeon General of the Middle Department, Continental Army
- In office April 17, 1777 – January 30, 1778
- Appointed by: George Washington

Delegate to the Second Continental Congress from Pennsylvania
- In office July 22, 1776 – March 5, 1777

Personal details
- Born: January 4, 1746 Byberry, Province of Pennsylvania, British America
- Died: April 19, 1813 (aged 67) Philadelphia, Pennsylvania, U.S.
- Resting place: Christ Church Burial Ground, Philadelphia
- Spouse: Julia Stockton (m. 1776)
- Children: 13, including Richard and James
- Education: Princeton University; University of Pennsylvania; University of Edinburgh
- Occupation: Physician, Writer, Academic
- Known for: Signer of the United States Declaration of Independence
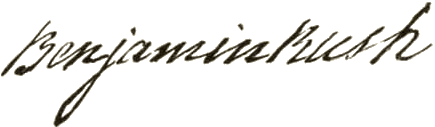
- Signature

Benjamin Rush (January 4, 1746 [O.S. December 24, 1745] – April 19, 1813) was an American revolutionary, a Founding Father of the United States and signatory to the U.S. Declaration of Independence, and a civic leader in Philadelphia, where he was a physician, politician, social reformer, humanitarian, educator, and the founder of Dickinson College. Rush was a Pennsylvania delegate to the Continental Congress. He later described his efforts in support of the American Revolution, saying: "He aimed well." He served as Surgeon General of the Middle Department of the Continental Army and became a professor of chemistry, medical theory, and clinical practice at the University of Pennsylvania.

Rush was a leader of the American Enlightenment and an enthusiastic supporter of the American Revolution. He was a leader in Pennsylvania's ratification of the U.S. Constitution in 1788. He was prominent in many reforms, especially in the areas of medicine and education. He opposed slavery, advocated free public schools, and sought improved, but patriarchal, education for women, and a more enlightened penal system. As a leading physician, Rush had a major impact on the emerging medical profession.

As an Enlightenment intellectual, Rush was committed to organizing all medical knowledge around explanatory theories, rather than relying on empirical methods. Rush argued that illness was the result of imbalances in the body's physical system and was caused by malfunctions in the brain. His approach prepared the way for later medical research, but Rush undertook none of it. He promoted public health by advocating for a clean environment and stressing the importance of personal and military hygiene. His study of mental disorder made him one of the founders of American psychiatry. In 1965, the American Psychiatric Association recognized Rush as the "father of American psychiatry".

== Early life and career ==
Coat of Arms of Benjamin Rush

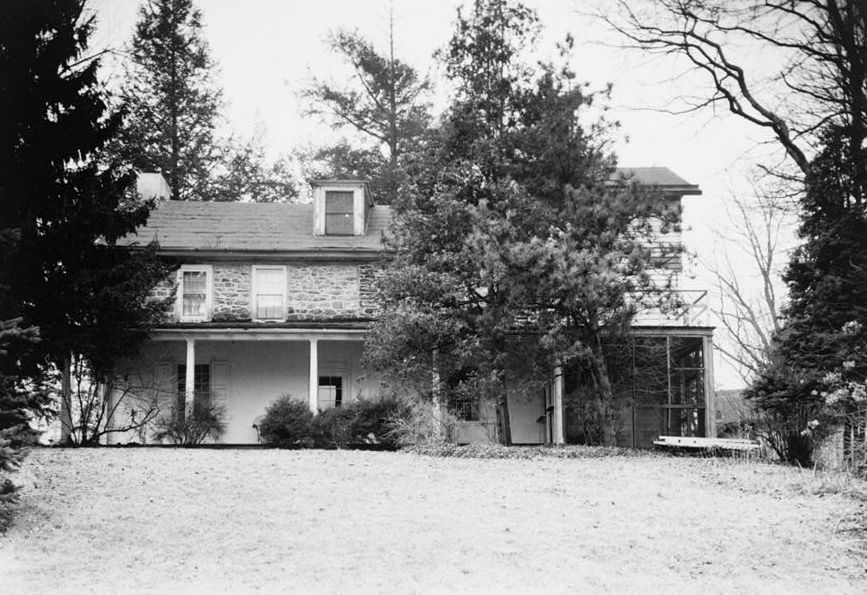
Rush's birthplace in the Byberry section of Philadelphia, photographed in 1959

Rush was born to John Rush and Susanna Hall on January 4, 1746 (December 24, 1745, O.S.). The family, of English descent, lived on a farm in the Township of Byberry in Philadelphia County, about 14 miles outside of Philadelphia (the township was incorporated into Philadelphia in 1854). Rush was the fourth of seven children. His father died in July 1751 at age 39, leaving his mother, who ran a country store, to care for the family. At age eight, Benjamin was sent to live with an aunt and uncle to receive an education. He and his older brother Jacob attended a school run by his uncle, the Reverend Samuel Finley, which later became West Nottingham Academy.

In 1760, after further studies at the College of New Jersey, which in 1895 became Princeton University, Rush graduated with a Bachelor of Arts degree at age 14. From 1761 to 1766, Rush apprenticed under John Redman in Philadelphia. Redman encouraged him to further his studies at the University of Edinburgh in Scotland, where Rush studied from 1766 to 1768 and earned an M.D. degree. Rush became fluent in French, Italian, and Spanish as a result of his studies and European tour. While at Edinburgh, he became a friend of the Earl of Leven and his family, including William Leslie.

Returning to the Colonies in 1769, Rush opened a medical practice in Philadelphia and became professor of chemistry at the College of Philadelphia (which in 1791 changed its name to its present name, University of Pennsylvania). After his election to the revived American Philosophical Society in 1768, Rush served as the society's curator from 1770 to 1773, as secretary from 1773 to 1773, and vice president from 1797 to 1801. Rush ultimately published the first American textbook on chemistry and several volumes on medical student education and wrote influential patriotic essays.

== Revolutionary period ==
Rush was active in the Sons of Liberty and was elected to attend the provincial conference to send delegates to the Continental Congress. Thomas Paine consulted Rush when writing the profoundly influential pro-independence pamphlet Common Sense. Starting in 1776, Rush represented Pennsylvania and signed the Declaration of Independence. He also represented Philadelphia at Pennsylvania's own Constitutional Convention.

In an 1811 letter to John Adams, Rush recounted in stark fashion the signing of the Declaration of Independence. He described it as a scene of "pensive and awful silence". Rush said the delegates were called up, one after another, and then filed forward somberly to subscribe to what each thought was their ensuing death warrant. He related that the "gloom of the morning" was briefly interrupted when the rotund Benjamin Harrison of Virginia said to a diminutive Elbridge Gerry of Massachusetts, at the signing table, "I shall have a great advantage over you, Mr. Gerry, when we are all hung for what we are now doing. From the size and weight of my body I shall die in a few minutes and be with the Angels, but from the lightness of your body you will dance in the air an hour or two before you are dead." According to Rush, Harrison's remark "procured a transient smile, but it was soon succeeded by the Solemnity with which the whole business was conducted."

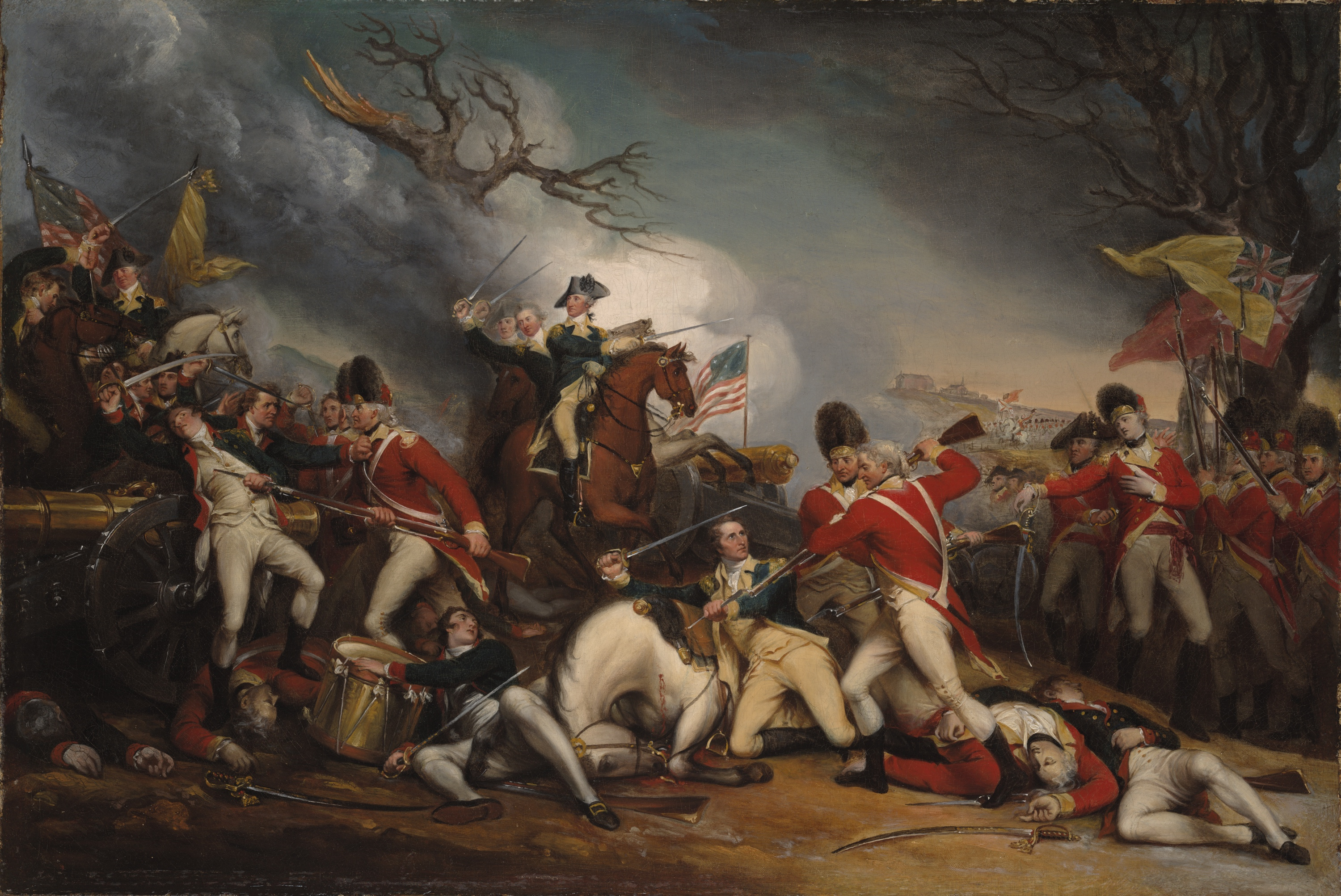
The Death of General Mercer at the Battle of Princeton, January 3, 1777 a portrait by John Trumbull depicting Rush and General George Washington entering from the background with Captain William Leslie, shown on the right, mortally wounded

While Rush was representing Pennsylvania in the Continental Congress (and serving on its medical committee), he also used his medical skills in the field. Rush accompanied the Philadelphia militia during the battles after which the British occupied Philadelphia and most of New Jersey. He was depicted serving in the Battle of Princeton in the painting The Death of General Mercer at the Battle of Princeton, January 3, 1777 by the American artist John Trumbull.

The Army Medical Service was in disarray, between the military casualties, extremely high losses from typhoid, yellow fever and other camp illnesses, political conflicts between John Morgan and William Shippen Jr., and inadequate supplies and guidance from the medical committee. Nonetheless, Rush accepted an appointment as surgeon-general of the middle department of the Continental Army. Rush's order "Directions for preserving the health of soldiers" became one of the foundations of preventive military medicine and was repeatedly republished, including as late as 1908. However, Rush's reporting of Shippen's misappropriation of food and wine supplies intended to comfort hospitalized soldiers, under-reporting of patient deaths, and failure to visit the hospitals under his command, ultimately led to Rush's resignation in 1778.

== Controversy ==
Rush criticized General George Washington in two handwritten but unsigned letters while still serving under the surgeon general. One, to Virginia Governor Patrick Henry dated October 13, 1778, quotes General Thomas Conway saying that if not for God's grace the ongoing war would have been lost by Washington and his weak counselors. Henry forwarded the letter to Washington, despite Rush's request that the criticism be conveyed orally, and Washington recognized the handwriting. At the time, the supposed Conway Cabal was reportedly trying to replace Washington with Horatio Gates as commander-in-chief. Rush's letter relayed General John Sullivan's criticism that forces directly under Washington were undisciplined and mob-like, and contrasted Gates' army as "a well-regulated family". Ten days later, Rush wrote to John Adams relaying complaints inside Washington's army, including about "bad bread, no order, universal disgust" and praising Conway, who had been appointed to inspector general.

Shippen sought Rush's resignation and received it by the end of the month after Continental Congress delegate John Witherspoon, chairman of a committee to investigate Morgan's and Rush's charges of misappropriation and mismanagement against Shippen, told Rush his complaints would not produce reform. Rush later expressed regret for his gossip against Washington. In a letter to John Adams in 1812, Rush wrote, "He [Washington] was the highly favored instrument whose patriotism and name contributed greatly to the establishment of the independence of the United States." Rush also successfully pleaded with Washington's biographers Justice Bushrod Washington and Chief Justice John Marshall to delete his association with those stinging words.

In his 2005 book 1776, David McCullough quotes Rush, referring to George Washington:

The Philadelphia physician and patriot Benjamin Rush, a staunch admirer, observed that Washington "has so much martial dignity in his deportment that you would distinguish him to be a general and a soldier from among 10,000 people. There is not a king in Europe that would not look like a valet de chambre by his side."

== Post-Revolution ==
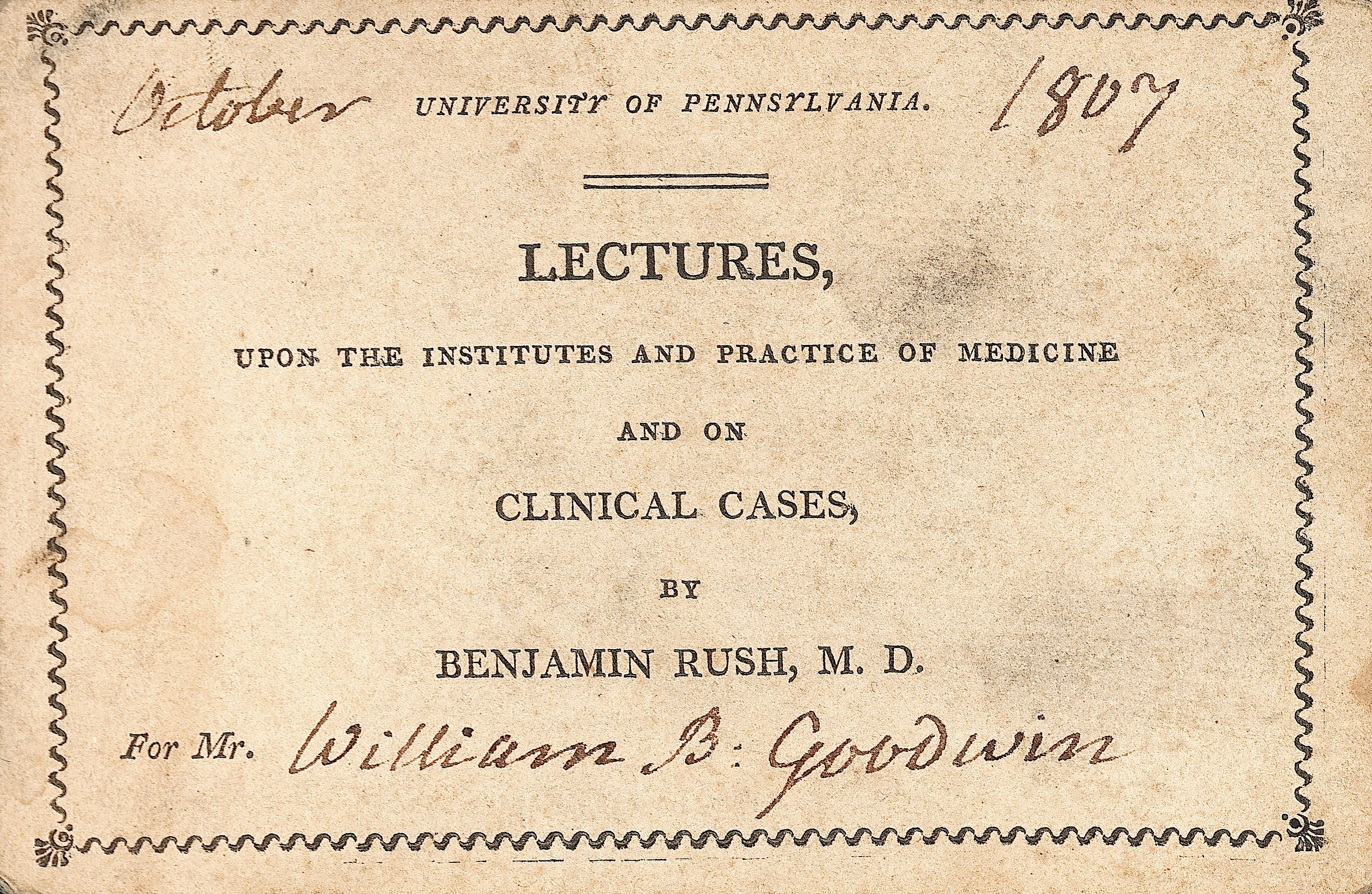
Ticket to an 1807 lecture given by Rush, then a University of Pennsylvania School of Medicine professor

Rush believed that, while America was free from British rule, the "American Revolution" had yet to finish. As expressed in his 1787 'Address to the People of the United States', "The American war is over: but this is far from being the case with the American revolution. On the contrary, nothing but the first act of the great drama is closed." In this address, he encouraged Americans to "come forward" and continue advancements on behalf of America.

In 1783, he was appointed to the staff of Pennsylvania Hospital, and he remained a member until his death. He was elected to the Pennsylvania convention which adopted the Federal constitution and was appointed treasurer of the United States Mint, serving from 1797 to 1813. He was elected a fellow of the American Academy of Arts and Sciences in 1788.

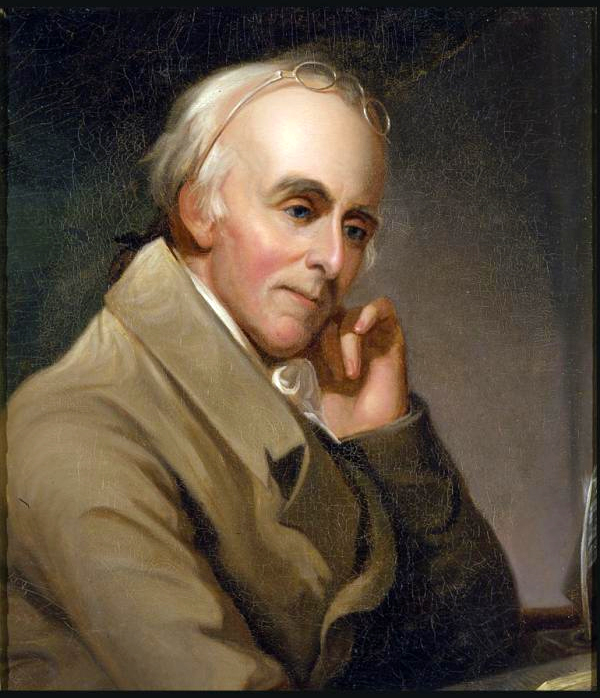
A c. 1818 portrait of Rush by Charles Willson Peale

He became a professor of medical theory and clinical practice at the University of Pennsylvania in 1791, though the quality of his medicine was quite primitive even for the time: he advocated bloodletting for almost any illness, long after its practice had declined. While teaching at the University of Pennsylvania, one of his students was future president William Henry Harrison, who took a chemistry class from Rush.

He was also founder of Dickinson College in Carlisle, Pennsylvania. In 1794, he was elected a foreign member of the Royal Swedish Academy of Sciences. In the 1793 Philadelphia yellow fever epidemic, Rush treated patients with bleeding, calomel, and other early medicinal techniques that often were ineffective and actually brought many patients closer to their deathbeds. Rush's ideas on yellow fever treatments differed from those of many experienced French doctors, who came from the West Indies where there were yellow fever outbreaks every year. However, he also helped the population of the city by convincing Richard Allen to ask members of his African Methodist Episcopal Church and other free blacks, who it was believed were less affected by yellow fever than other Philadelphians, to perform volunteer aid work for doctors and funeral homes.

Rush came down with yellow fever himself during the 1793 epidemic, although he recovered from it.

Rush took on several social causes during his lifetime. Rush became a social activist and an abolitionist and was a founding member of the Philadelphia Society for Alleviating the Miseries of Public Prisons (known today as the Pennsylvania Prison Society), which greatly influenced the construction of Eastern State Penitentiary in Philadelphia. He supported Thomas Jefferson for president in 1796 over the eventual winner, John Adams.

== Corps of Discovery ==
In 1803, Jefferson sent Meriwether Lewis to Philadelphia to prepare for the Lewis and Clark Expedition under the tutelage of Rush, who taught Lewis about frontier illnesses and the performance of bloodletting. Rush provided the corps with a medical kit that included:

- Turkish opium for nervousness
- emetics to induce vomiting
- medicinal wine
- fifty dozen of Dr. Rush's Bilious Pills, laxatives containing more than 50% mercury, which have since colloquially been referred to as "thunderclappers". Their meat-rich diet and lack of clean water during the expedition gave the men cause to use them frequently. Although their efficacy is questionable, their high mercury content provided a tracer by which archaeologists have been able to verify one of the Corps' campsites on their route to the Pacific. As of 2024, Travelers' Rest State Park, near Lolo, Montana, is the only location to be confirmed via the analysis of the Corps' latrines.

== Reforms ==
=== Anti-slavery ===
In 1766, when Rush set out for his studies in Edinburgh, he was outraged by the sight of 100 slave ships in Liverpool harbor. As a prominent Presbyterian doctor and professor of chemistry in Philadelphia, he provided a bold and respected voice against the slave trade. He warmly praised the ministry of "Black Harry" Hosier, the freedman circuit rider who accompanied Bishop Francis Asbury during the establishment of the Methodist Church in America, but the highlight of his involvement was the pamphlet he wrote in 1773 entitled "An Address to the Inhabitants of the British Settlements in America, upon Slave-Keeping." In this first of his many attacks on the social evils of his day, he assailed the slave trade as well as the entire institution of slavery. Rush argued scientifically that Blacks were not by nature intellectually or morally inferior. Any apparent evidence to the contrary was only the perverted expression of slavery, which "is so foreign to the human mind, that the moral faculties, as well as those of the understanding are debased, and rendered torpid by it."

=== Anti-capital punishment ===
Rush deemed public punishments such as putting a person on display in stocks, common at the time, to be counterproductive. Instead, he proposed private confinement, labor, solitude, and religious instruction for criminals, and he opposed the death penalty. His outspoken opposition to capital punishment pushed the Pennsylvania legislature to abolish the death penalty for all crimes other than first-degree murder. He authored a 1792 treatise on punishing murder by death in which he made three principal arguments:

I. Every man possesses an absolute power over his own liberty and property, but not over his own life...
II. The punishment of murder by death, is contrary to reason, and to the order and happiness of society...
III. The punishment of murder by death, is contrary to divine revelation.

Rush led the state of Pennsylvania to establish the first state penitentiary, the Walnut Street Prison, in 1790. Rush campaigned for long-term imprisonment, the denial of liberty, as both the most humane but severe punishment. This 1792 treatise was preceded by comments on the efficacy of the death penalty that he self-references and which, evidently, appeared in the second volume of the American Museum.

=== Status of women ===
After the Revolution, Rush proposed a new model of education for elite women that included English language, vocal music, dancing, sciences, bookkeeping, history, and moral philosophy. He was instrumental to the founding of the Young Ladies' Academy of Philadelphia, the first chartered women's institution of higher education in Philadelphia. Rush saw little need for training women in metaphysics, logic, mathematics, or advanced science; rather he wanted the emphasis on guiding women toward moral essays, poetry, history, and religious writings. This type of education for elite women grew dramatically during the post-revolutionary period, as women claimed a role in creating the Republic. And so, the ideal of Republican motherhood emerged, lauding women's responsibility of instructing the young in the obligations of patriotism, the blessings of liberty and the true meaning of Republicanism. He opposed coeducational classrooms and insisted on the need to instruct all youth in the Christian religion.

== Medical contributions ==
=== Physical medicine ===
Rush was a leading proponent of heroic medicine. He firmly believed in such practices as bloodletting patients (a practice now known to be generally harmful, but at the time common practice), as well as purges using calomel and other toxic substances. In his report on the Philadelphia yellow fever epidemic of 1793, Rush wrote: "I have found bleeding to be useful, not only in cases where the pulse was full and quick but where it was slow and tense. I have bled twice in many and in one acute case four times, with the happiest effect. I consider intrepidity in the use of the lancet, at present, to be necessary, as it is in the use of mercury and jalap, in this insidious and ferocious disease." During that epidemic, Rush gained acclaim for remaining in town and treating sometimes 100 patients per day (some through freed black volunteers coordinated by Richard Allen), but many died. Even Rush acknowledged the failure of two treatments, sweats in vinegar-wrapped blankets accompanied by mercury rubs, and cold baths.

William Cobbett vociferously objected to Rush's extreme use of bloodletting, and even in Rush's day and location, many physicians had abandoned it on scientific grounds. Cobbett accused Rush of killing more patients than he had saved. Rush ultimately sued Cobbett for libel, winning a judgment of $5,000 and $3,000 in court costs, which was only partially paid before Cobbett returned to England. Nonetheless, Rush's practice waned as he continued to advocate bloodletting and purges, much to the chagrin of his friend Thomas Jefferson. Some even blamed Rush's bleeding for hastening the death of Benjamin Franklin, as well as George Washington (although the only one of Washington's medics who opposed the bleeding was Rush's former student), and Rush insisted upon being bled himself shortly before his death (as he had during the yellow fever epidemic two decades earlier).

Rush also wrote the first case report on dengue fever (published in 1789 on a case from 1780). Perhaps his greatest contributions to physical medicine were his establishment of a public dispensary for low-income patients (Philadelphia Dispensary), and public works associated with draining and rerouting Dock Creek (eliminating mosquito breeding grounds, which greatly decreased typhus, typhoid and cholera outbreaks).

Another of Rush's medical views that now draws criticism is his analysis of race. In reviewing the case of Henry Moss, a slave who lost his dark skin color (probably through vitiligo), Rush characterized being black as a hereditary and curable skin disease. Rush wrote that the "disease, instead of inviting us [whites] to tyrannise over them [blacks], it should entitle them to a double portion of our humanity." He added that this "should teach white people the necessity of keeping up that prejudice against [miscegenation], as it would tend to infect posterity with … their disorder" and called for an "endeavour to discover a remedy for it."

==== Native American health ====
Rush was interested in Native American health. He wanted to find out why Native Americans were susceptible to certain illnesses and whether they had higher mortality rates as compared to other people. Other questions that he raised were whether they dreamed more and if their hair turned gray as they got older. His fascination with indigenous peoples came from his interest in the theory that social scientists can better study the history of their own civilization by studying cultures in earlier stages of development, "primitive men". In his autobiography, he writes "From a review of the three different species of settlers, it appears that there are certain regular stages which mark the progress from the savage to civilized life. The first settler is nearly related to an Indian in his manners. In the second, the Indian manners are more diluted. It is in the third species only that we behold civilization completed. It is to the third species of settlers only that it is proper to apply the term of farmers. While we record the voices of the first and second settlers, it is but just to mention their virtues likewise. Their mutual wants to produce mutual dependence; hence they are kind and friendly to each other. Their solitary situation makes visitors agreeable to them; hence they are hospitable to a stranger."

==== False quote ====
One bogus quote sometimes falsely assigned to Rush portrays him as a medical libertarian:

Unless we put medical freedoms into the Constitution, the time will come when medicine will organize into an undercover dictatorship [. . .] To restrict the art of healing to one class of men and deny equal privileges to others will constitute the Bastille of medical science. All such laws are un-American and despotic and have no place in a republic [. . .] The Constitution of this republic should make special privilege for medical freedom as well as religious freedom."

The statement was probably not made by Rush and does not represent his actual position. No primary source for it has been found, and the words "un-American" and "undercover" are anachronisms, as their usage as such did not appear until long after Rush's death.

=== Mental health ===
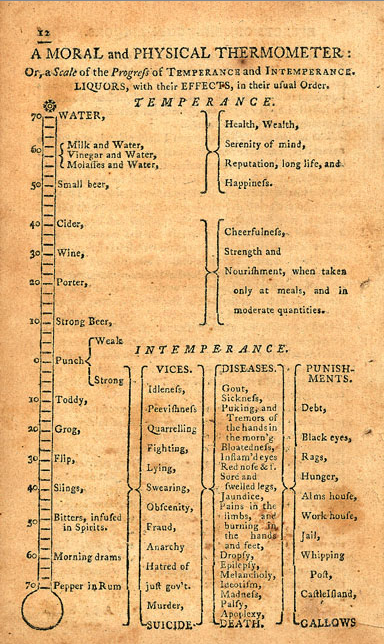
"The Moral Thermometer" from Rush's An Inquiry into the Effects of Spirituous Liquors on the Human Body and the Mind, published in 1790; its original edition is now housed in the Library Company of Philadelphia

Rush published one of the first descriptions and treatments for psychiatric disorders in American medicine, Medical Inquiries and Observations, Upon the Diseases of the Mind (1812). He undertook to classify different forms of mental illness and to theorize as to their causes and possible cures. Rush believed (incorrectly) that many mental illnesses were caused by disruptions of blood circulation or by sensory overload and treated them with devices meant to improve circulation to the brain such as a centrifugal spinning board, and inactivity/sensory deprivation via a restraining chair with a sensory-deprivation head enclosure ("tranquilizer chair"). After seeing mental patients in appalling conditions in Pennsylvania Hospital, Rush led a successful campaign in 1792 for the state to build a separate mental ward where the patients could be kept in more humane conditions.

Rush believed, as did so many physicians of the time, that bleeding and active purging with mercury(I) chloride (calomel) were the preferable medical treatments for insanity, a fact evidenced by his statement that, "It is sometimes difficult to prevail upon patients in this state of madness, or even to compel them, to take mercury in any of the ways in which it is usually administered. In these cases I have succeeded, by sprinkling a few grains of calomel daily upon a piece of bread, and afterwards spreading over it, a thin covering of butter." Rush followed the standard procedures of bleeding and treatment with mercury, he did believe that "coercion" and "restraint", the physical punishment, chains and dungeons, which were the practice of the time, were the answer as proven by his invention of the restraint chair and other devices. For this reason, some aspects of his approach could be seen as similar to Moral Therapy, which would soon rise to prominence in at least the wealthier institutions of Europe and the United States.

Rush is sometimes considered a pioneer of occupational therapy particularly as it pertains to the institutionalized. In Diseases of the Mind (1812), Rush wrote:

It has been remarked that the maniacs of the male sex in all hospitals, who assist in cutting wood, making fires, and digging in a garden, and the females who are employed in washing, ironing, and scrubbing floors, often recover, while persons, whose rank exempts them from performing such services, languish away their lives within the walls of the hospital.

Furthermore, Rush was one of the first people to describe Savant Syndrome. In 1789, he described the abilities of Thomas Fuller, an enslaved African who was a lightning calculator. His observation would later be described in other individuals by notable scientists like John Langdon Down.

Rush pioneered the therapeutic approach to addiction. Prior to his work, drunkenness was viewed as being sinful and a matter of choice. Rush believed that the alcoholic loses control over himself and identified the properties of alcohol, rather than the alcoholic's choice, as the causal agent. He developed the conception of alcoholism as a form of medical disease and proposed that alcoholics should be weaned from their addiction via less potent substances.

Rush advocated for more humane mental institutions and perpetuated the idea that people with mental illness are people who have an illness, rather than inhuman animals. He is quoted to have said, "Terror acts powerfully upon the body, through the medium of the mind, and should be employed in the cure of madness." He also championed the idea of "partial madness," or that people could have varying degrees of mental illness.

The American Psychiatric Association's seal bears an image of Rush's purported profile at its center. The outer ring of the seal contains the words "American Psychiatric Association 1844". The Association's history of the seal states:

The choice of Rush (1746–1813) for the seal reflects his place in history. .... Rush's practice of psychiatry was based on bleeding, purging, and the use of the tranquilizer chair and gyrator. (Note: The gyrator is described by the University of Pennsylvania as "a horizontal board on which torpid patients were strapped and spun to stimulate blood circulation.") By 1844 these practices were considered erroneous and abandoned. Rush, however, was the first American to study mental disorder in a systematic manner, and he is considered the father of American Psychiatry.

== Educational legacy ==
During his career, he educated over 3,000 medical students, and several of these established Rush Medical College in Chicago in his honor after his death. His students included Valentine Seaman, who mapped yellow fever mortality patterns in New York and introduced the smallpox vaccine to the United States in 1799. One of his last apprentices was Samuel A. Cartwright, later a Confederate States of America surgeon charged with improving sanitary conditions in the camps around Vicksburg, Mississippi, and Port Hudson, Louisiana. Rush University Medical Center in Chicago, formerly Rush-Presbyterian-St. Luke's Medical Center, was named in his honor.

== Religious views and vision ==
Rush advocated Christianity in public life and in education and sometimes compared himself to the prophet Jeremiah. Rush regularly attended Christ Church in Philadelphia and counted William White among his closest friends (and neighbors). Ever the controversialist, Rush became involved in internal disputes over the revised Book of Common Prayer and the splitting of the Episcopal Church from the Church of England. He dabbled with Presbyterianism, Methodism (which split from Anglicanism in those years), and Unitarianism. In a letter to John Adams, Rush describes his religious views as "a compound of the orthodoxy and heterodoxy of most of our Christian churches." Christian Universalists consider him one of their founders, although Rush stopped attending that church after the death of his friend, former Baptist pastor Elhanan Winchester, in 1797.

Rush fought for temperance and both public and Sunday schools. He helped found the Bible Society at Philadelphia (now known as the Pennsylvania Bible Society) and promoted the American Sunday School Union. When many public schools stopped using the Bible as a textbook, Rush proposed that the U.S. government require such use, as well as furnish an American Bible to every family at public expense. In 1806, Rush proposed inscribing "The Son of Man Came into the World, Not To Destroy Men's Lives, But To Save Them." above the doors of courthouses and other public buildings. Earlier, on July 16, 1776, Rush had complained to Patrick Henry about a provision in Virginia's constitution of 1776 which forbade clergymen from serving in the legislature.

Rush felt that the United States was the work of God: "I do not believe that the Constitution was the offspring of inspiration, but I am as perfectly satisfied that the Union of the United States in its form and adoption is as much the work of a Divine Providence as any of the miracles recorded in the Old and New Testament". In 1798, after the Constitution's adoption, Rush declared: "The only foundation for a useful education in a republic is to be laid in Religion. Without this there can be no virtue, and without virtue there can be no liberty, and liberty is the object and life of all republican governments."

Before 1779, Rush's religious views were influenced by what he described as "Fletcher's controversy with the Calvinists in favor of the Universality of the atonement." After hearing Elhanan Winchester preach, Rush indicated that this theology "embraced and reconciled my ancient calvinistical, and my newly adopted (Arminian) principles. From that time on I have never doubted upon the subject of the salvation of all men." To simplify, both believed in punishment after death for the wicked. His wife, Julia Rush, thought her husband like Martin Luther for his ardent passions, fearless attacks on old prejudices, and quick tongue against perceived enemies.

Rush helped Richard Allen found the African Methodist Episcopal Church. In his autobiography, Allen wrote:

...By this time we had waited on Dr. Rush and Mr. Robert Ralston, and told them of our distressing situation. We considered it a blessing that the Lord had put it into our hearts to wait upon... those gentle-men. They pitied our situation, and subscribed largely towards the church, and were very friendly towards us and advised us how to go on. We appointed Mr. Ralston our treasurer. Dr. Rush did much for us in public by his influence. I hope the name of Dr. Benjamin Rush and Mr. Robert Ralston will never be forgotten among us. They were the two first gentlemen who espoused the cause of the oppressed and aided us in building the house of the Lord for the poor Africans to worship in. Here was the beginning and rise of the first African church in America."

== Personal life ==
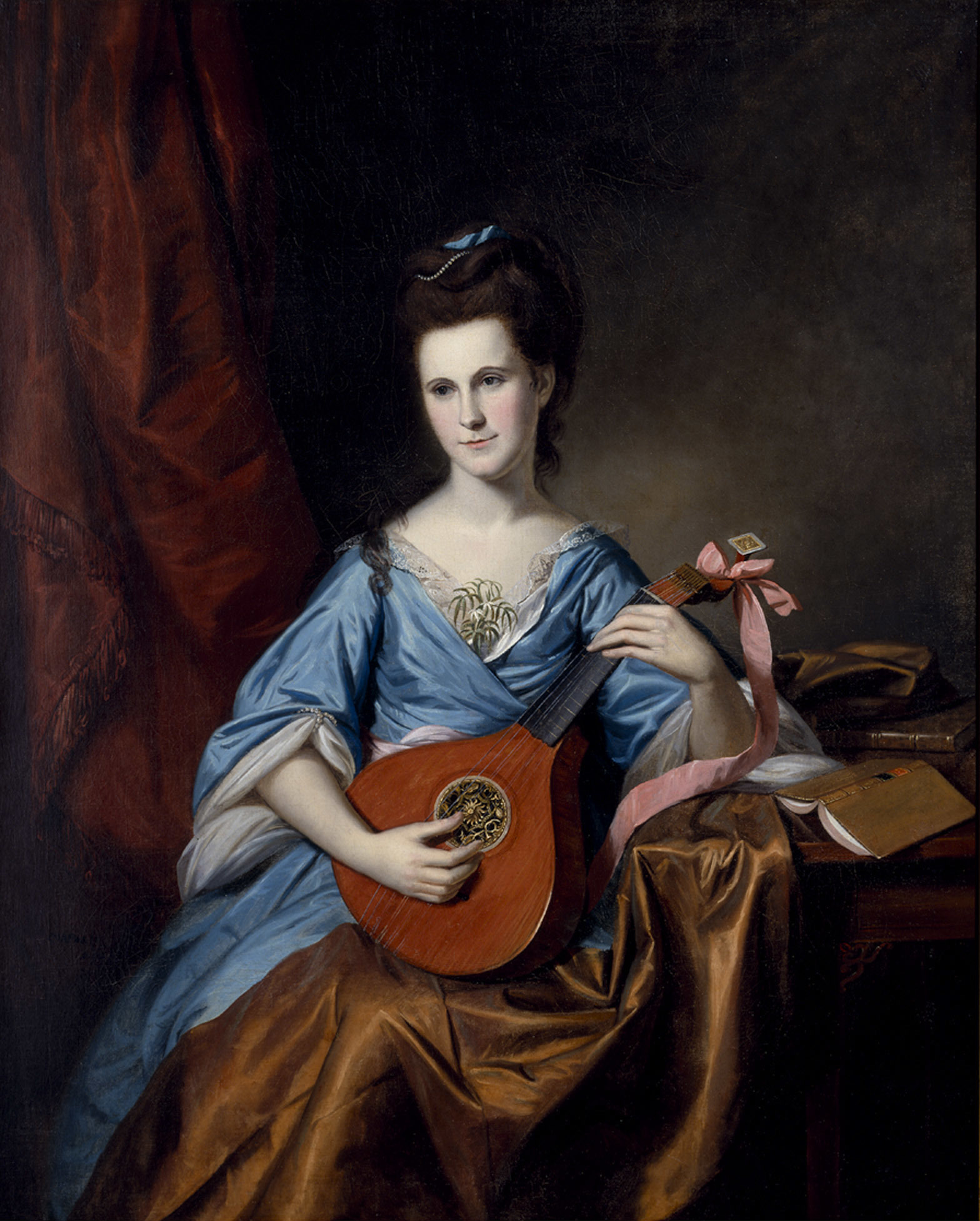
Julia Stockton Rush, painted by Charles Willson Peale

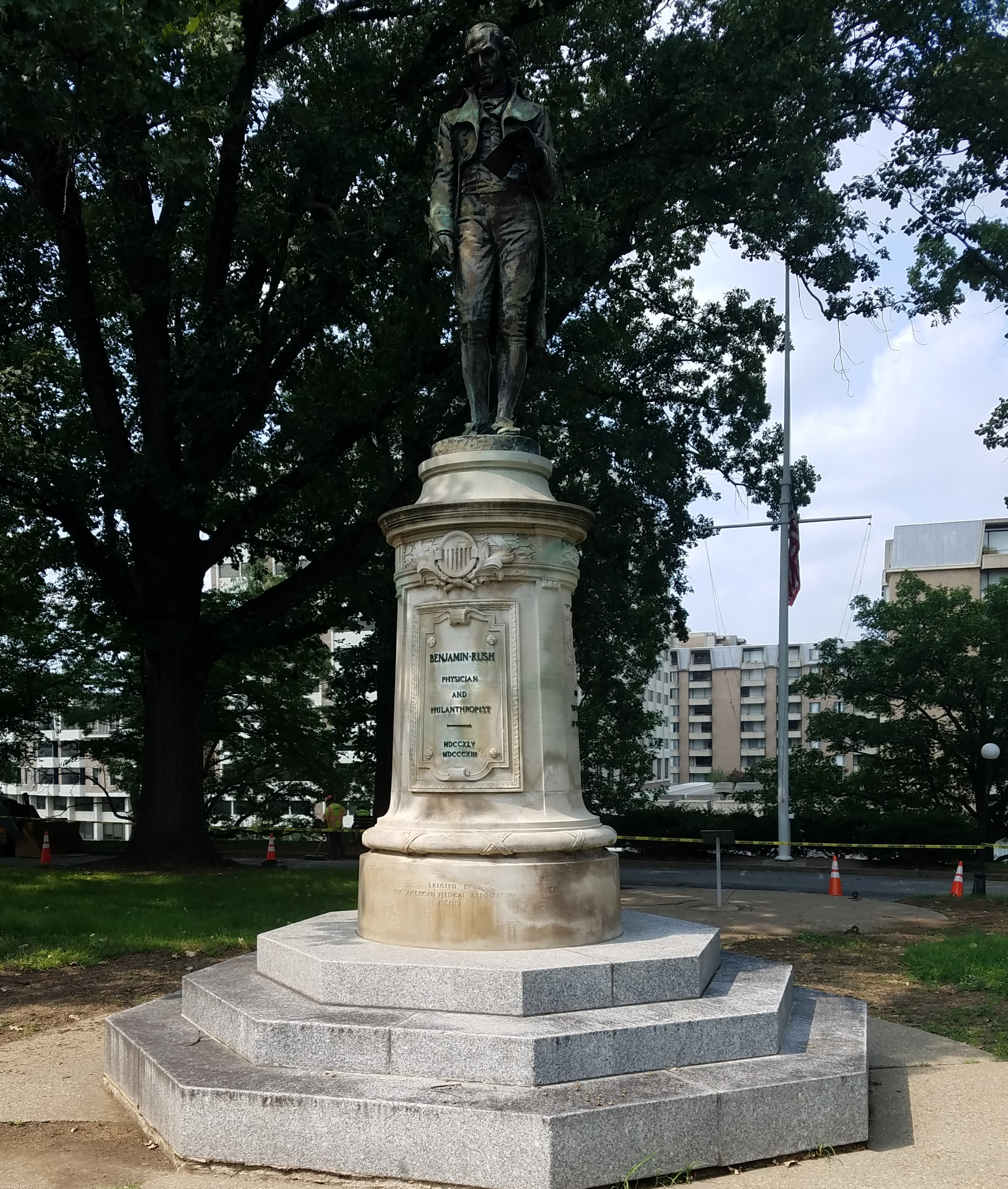
Benjamin Rush statue on "Navy Hill" which is, due to security, in a section of Washington, D.C., not accessible to tourists

On January 11, 1776, Rush married Julia Stockton (1759–1848), daughter of Richard Stockton, another signer of the Declaration of Independence, and his wife Annis Boudinot Stockton. They had 13 children, 9 of whom survived their first year: John, Ann Emily, Richard, Susannah (died as an infant), Elizabeth Graeme (died as an infant), Mary B, James, William (died as an infant), Benjamin (died as an infant), Benjamin, Julia, Samuel, and William. Richard later became a member of the cabinets of James Madison, James Monroe, John Quincy Adams, Andrew Jackson, James K. Polk, and Zachary Taylor (at one point during each of their presidencies).

In 1812, Rush helped reconcile the friendship of Jefferson and Adams by encouraging the two former presidents to resume writing to each other. Once divided over politics and political rivalries, Jefferson and Adams grew close. On July 4, 1826, the 50th anniversary of the signing of the U.S. Declaration of Independence, Jefferson and Adams both died within hours of each other.

== Death ==
After dying of typhus fever, he was buried (in Section N67) along with his wife Julia in the Christ Church Burial Ground in Philadelphia, not far from where Benjamin Franklin is buried. At the site, a small plaque honoring Benjamin Rush has been placed. However, the box marker is next to the plaque on the right, with inscriptions on the top. The inscription reads,

In memory of
Benjamin Rush MD
he died on the 19th of April
in the year of our Lord 1813
Aged 68 years
Well done good and faithful servant
enter thou into the joy of the Lord

Mrs Julia Rush
consort of
Benjamin Rush MD
Born March 2, 1759
Died July 7, 1848
For as in Adam, all die, even so in Christ
Shall all be made alive

== Legacy ==
Benjamin Rush Elementary School in Redmond, Washington, was named by its students for him. The Arts Academy at Benjamin Rush magnet high school in Philadelphia was established in 2008. Rush County, Indiana, is named for him as is its county seat, Rushville. In Chicago, Rush Street as well as Rush University Medical Center are both named for Rush. Benjamin Rush State Park in Philadelphia is named after Rush. The eponymous conservative Benjamin Rush Institute is an associate member of the State Policy Network. The Benjamin Rush Garden at Third and Walnut Streets in Philadelphia is at the site of his house and is part of Independence National Historical Park.

== Writings ==
- Rush, Benjamin (1773). "An Address to the Inhabitants of the British Settlements in America, Upon Slave-keeping". Philadelphia: J. Dunlap.
- Rush, Benjamin (1819) [1791]. An inquiry into the effects of ardent spirits upon the human body and mind: with an account of the means of preventing, and of the remedies for curing them. Josiah Richardson.
- Rush, Benjamin (1794). An account of the bilious remitting yellow fever, as it appeared in the city of Philadelphia, in the year 1793. Philadelphia: Thomas Dobson.
- Rush, Benjamin (1798). Essays: Literary, Moral, and Philosophical. Philadelphia: Thomas & Samuel F. Bradford. 1989 reprint: Syracuse University Press, ISBN 0-912756-22-5
- Rush, Benjamin (1799). "Observations Intended to Favour a Supposition That the Black Color (As It Is Called) of the Negroes Is Derived from the Leprosy". Transactions of the American Philosophical Society. 4: 289–297. doi:10.2307/1005108. JSTOR 1005108.
- Rush, Benjamin (1806). "A plan of a Peace-Office for the United States". Essays, Literary, Moral and Philosophical (2nd ed.). Philadelphia: Thomas and William Bradford. pp. 183–88 – via Internet Archive.
- Rush, Benjamin (1808) [1778]. Directions for preserving the health of soldiers: addressed to the officers of the Army of the United States. Philadelphia: Thomas Dobson.
- Rush, Benjamin (1812) Medical Inquiries And Observations Upon The Diseases Of The Mind, 2006 reprint: Kessinger Publishing, ISBN 1-4286-2669-7. Free digital copies of original published in 1812 at http://deila.dickinson.edu/theirownwords/title/0034. or https://web.archive.org/web/20121024024628/http://collections.nlm.nih.gov/muradora/objectView.action?pid=nlm%3Anlmuid-2569036R-bk
- Rush, Benjamin (2003). "Medical Inquiries and Observations, Upon the Diseases of the Mind: Philadelphia: Published by Kimber & Richardson, no. 237, Market Street; Merritt, printer, no. 9, Watkins Alley, 1812". Their Own Words. Carlisle, Pennsylvania: Dickinson College. OCLC 53177922. Archived from the original on January 7, 2004.
- Rush, Benjamin (1815). "A Defence of Blood-letting, as a Remedy for Certain Diseases". Medical Inquiries and Observations. 4.
- Rush, Benjamin (1830). Medical Inquiries and Observations upon Diseases of the Mind (4 ed.). Philadelphia: John Grigg. pp. 98, 197.
- Rush, Benjamin (1835). Medical Inquiries and Observations Upon the Diseases of the Mind (Fifth ed.). Philadelphia: Grigg and Elliott, No. 9 North Fourth Street. OCLC 2812179 – via Internet Archive.
- Rush, Benjamin (1947). The selected writings of Benjamin Rush. New York: Philosophical Library. p. 448. ISBN 978-0-8065-2955-4.
- Butterfield, Lyman H., ed. (1951). Letters of Benjamin Rush. Memoirs of the American Philosophical Society. Princeton University Press. OCLC 877738348.
- The Spur of Fame: Dialogues of John Adams and Benjamin Rush, 1805–1813 (2001), Liberty Fund, ISBN 0-86597-287-7
- Rush, Benjamin (1970) [1948]. George Washington Corner (ed.). The autobiography of Benjamin Rush; his Travels through life together with his Commonplace book for 1789–1813. Westport, CT: Greenwood Press.
- Fox, Claire G.; Miller, Gordon L.; Miller, Jacquelyn C. (1996). Benjamin Rush, M.D: A Bibliographic Guide. Greenwood Press. ISBN 978-0-313-29823-3.

=== Archival collections ===
The Presbyterian Historical Society in Philadelphia, Pennsylvania, has a collection of Benjamin Rush's original manuscripts.

The Library Company of Philadelphia has papers of the Rush family including a significant correspondence collection.

== See also ==
- List of abolitionist forerunners
- Memorial to the 56 Signers of the Declaration of Independence
