= Charles Thomson =

American Founding Father and patriot leader (1729–1824)

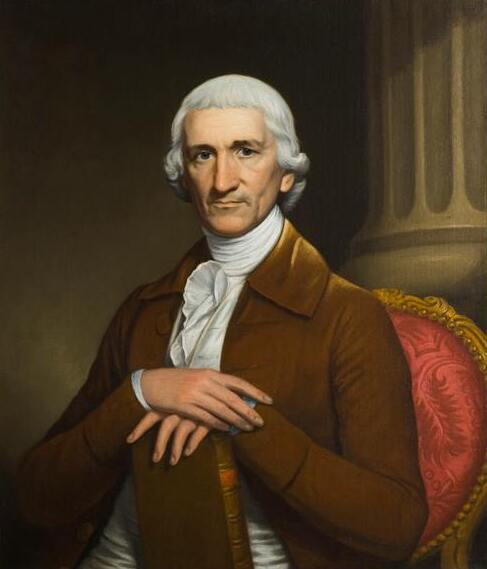
- Portrait by Joseph Wright, c. 1785

Secretary of the Continental Congress
- In office September 5, 1774 – July 23, 1789
- Preceded by: Position established
- Succeeded by: Position abolished

Personal details
- Born: November 29, 1729 Maghera, County Londonderry, Kingdom of Ireland
- Died: August 16, 1824 (aged 94) Lower Merion Township, Pennsylvania, U.S.
- Resting place: Laurel Hill Cemetery, Philadelphia, Pennsylvania, U.S.
- Spouse(s): Ruth Mather (m. 1758, d. 1769); Hannah Harrison (m. 1774, d. 1807)
- Children: Twin daughters (died in infancy)
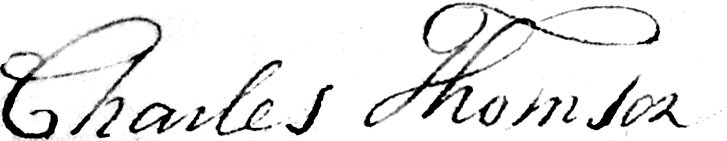
- Signature

Charles Thomson (November 29, 1729 – August 16, 1824) was an Irish-born Founding Father of the United States and secretary of the Continental Congress (1774–1789) throughout its existence. As secretary, Thomson prepared the Journals of the Continental Congress, and his and John Hancock's names were the only two to appear on the first printing of the United States Declaration of Independence.

Thomson is also known for co-designing the Great Seal of the United States and adding its Latin mottoes Annuit cœptis and Novus ordo seclorum. In 1808 his translation of the Bible's Old Testament was published, after almost two decades of work.

== Early life ==
Thomson was born in Maghera, County Londonderry, Ireland, to Scots-Irish migrants, Mr. and Mrs. John Thomson.

After the death of his wife in 1739, John Thomson migrated to the British colonies in North America with his sons (three or four brothers, including Charles). John Thomson died at sea, his possessions stolen, and the penniless boys were separated on arrival at New Castle, Delaware. Charles was first cared for by a blacksmith in New Castle and was educated in New London, Pennsylvania. In 1750 he became a tutor in Latin at the Philadelphia Academy, an ancestor school of the University of Pennsylvania.

== Political career ==
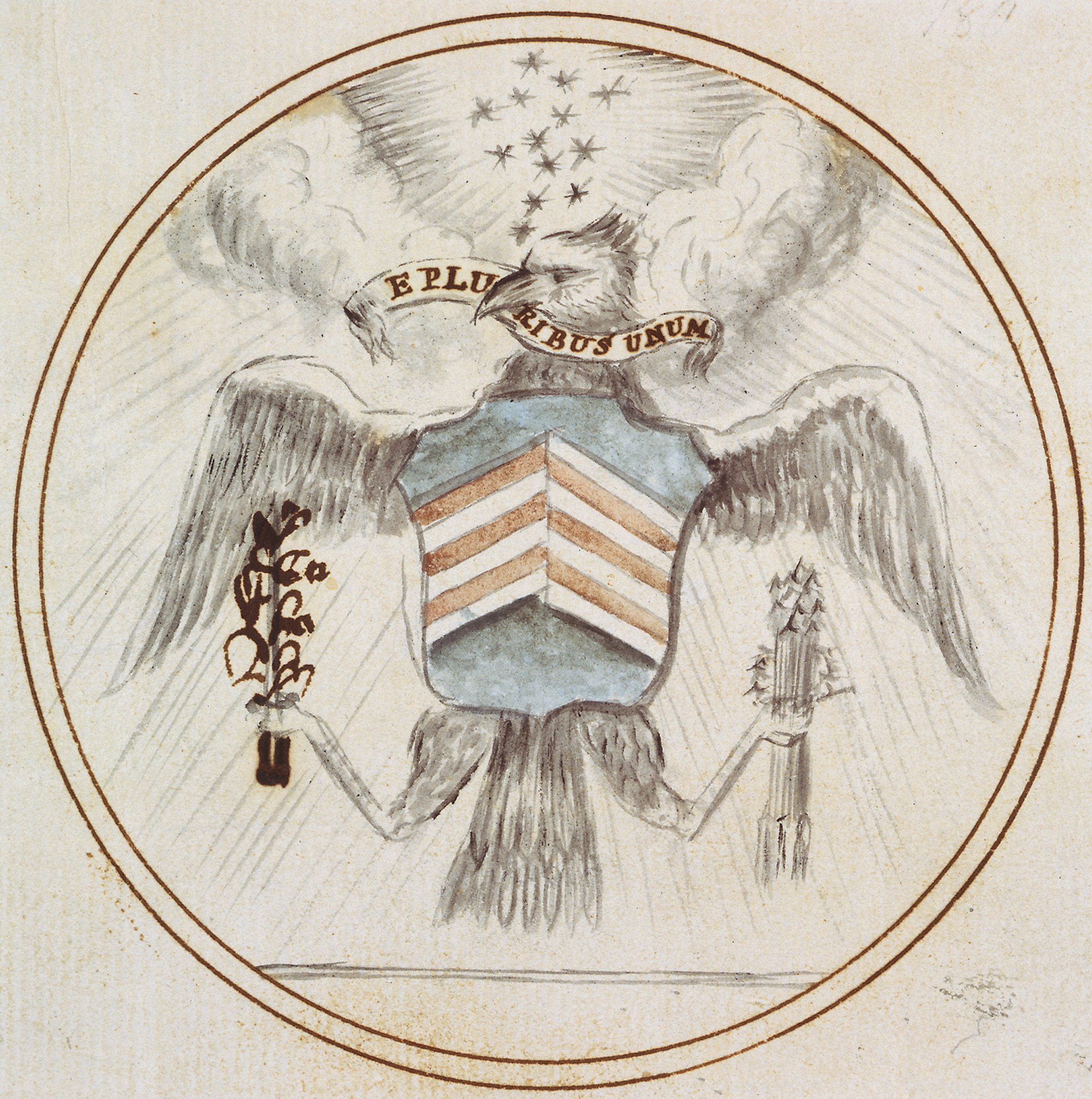
Thomson's proposal for the Great Seal of the United States (1793). A modified version was adopted by Congress.

During the French and Indian War, Thomson was an opponent of the Pennsylvania proprietors' American Indian policies. He served as secretary at the 1758 Treaty of Easton and wrote An Enquiry into the Causes of the Alienation of the Delaware and Shawanese Indians from the British Interest (1759), which blamed the war on the proprietors. The Delaware Indians adopted him into their tribe calling him, 'The-man-who-speaks-the-truth'. He was allied with Benjamin Franklin, the leader of the anti-proprietary party, but the two men parted politically during the crisis over the Stamp Act 1765. Thomson became a leader of Philadelphia's Sons of Liberty. He was inducted into the American Philosophical Society around 1750.

Thomson was a leader in the American Revolution of the early 1770s. John Adams called him the "Samuel Adams of Philadelphia." Thomson served as the secretary of the Continental Congress in its entirety. Through those 15 years, the Congress saw many delegates come and go, but Thomson's dedication to recording the debates and decisions provided continuity. Along with John Hancock, the president of the Congress, Thomson's name (as secretary) appeared on the first published version of the Declaration of Independence in July 1776.

Thomson's role as secretary to Congress was not limited to clerical duties. According to biographer Boyd Schlenther, Thomson "took a direct role in the conduct of foreign affairs." Fred S. Rolater has suggested that Thomson was essentially the "Prime Minister of the United States."

Thomson is also noted for designing, with William Barton, the Great Seal of the United States, which played a prominent role in the ratification of the Treaty of Paris on January 14, 1784 (Ratification Day). Britain's representatives in Paris initially disputed the placement of the Great Seal and Congressional President Thomas Mifflin's signature until they were mollified by Benjamin Franklin. When designing the final version of the Great Seal, Thomson (a former Latin teacher) kept the pyramid and eye for the reverse side but replaced the two mottos, using Annuit Cœptis instead of Deo Favente (and Novus ordo seclorum instead of Perennis). When he provided his official explanation of the meaning of this motto, he wrote:

The pyramid signifies Strength and Duration: The Eye over it & the Motto allude to the many signal interpositions of providence in favour of the American cause.

Thomson's service was not without its critics. James Searle, a delegate and close friend of John Adams, began a cane fight on the floor of Congress against Thomson over a claim that he was misquoted in the minutes that resulted in both men being slashed in the face. Such brawls on the floor were common, and many of them were prompted by argument over Thomson's recordings. Political disagreements prevented Thomson from getting a position in the new government created by the U.S. Constitution.

As Secretary of the Continental Congress, Thomson was also the keeper of the Great Seal of the United States, and he retained the Great Seal in his custody during the transition from the Confederation to the new United States government under the Constitution. As Secretary of Congress, Thomson understood it to be his duty to attend the meetings of the first U.S. Congress in 1789 pending the appointment of clerks and secretaries by both Houses, and he accordingly staffed the sessions of the United States Senate during the first few months of its existence, still signing papers under the title of Secretary of the Congress. Thomson aspired to be confirmed as Secretary of the newly constituted U.S. Congress or to be appointed Secretary of the Senate, but having failed to gain that appointment ( Samuel Allyne Otis was instead appointed Secretary of the Senate on April 8, 1789), Thomson relinquished his commission and handed over the Great Seal of the United States and his official papers to the United States Department of Foreign Affairs (the precursor of the United States Department of State) on July 23, 1789.

== George Washington's inauguration ==
In April 1789, Thomson was sent by the Senate to the home of George Washington in Virginia to notify him that he had been elected president of the United States. Thomson then accompanied Washington to New York for his inauguration.

== Writings ==
John Trumbull portrayed Thomson standing across the table from the Committee of Five in his 1818 painting Declaration of Independence. Since 1976 the painting has appeared on the United States two-dollar bill.

As secretary of Congress, Thomson chose what to include in the official journals of the Continental Congress. He also prepared a work of over 1,000 pages that covered the political history of the American Revolution. After leaving office, he chose to destroy the work in an effort to preserve the myths of War of Independence leaders as heroes and stated his desire to avoid "contradict[ing] all the histories of the great events of the Revolution. Let the world admire the supposed wisdom and valor of our great men. Perhaps they may adopt the qualities that have been ascribed to them, and thus good may be done. I shall not undeceive future generations."

According to the publisher's note of the Historical Printing Society edition of Thomas Jefferson's Notes on the State of Virginia (1894), edited by John Leicester Ford, Thomson contributed a 25-page appendix to the original English publication, published by John Stockdale of London in a run of approximately 200 copies. In 1853 JW Randolph and Company republished the work and incorporated various materials from the estate provided by Jefferson's literary executor, Thomas Jefferson Randolph. The new publication corrected some errors in the original Stockdale publication, including an error in the original publication which Jefferson made note of in a 1785 missive to Thomson: "Pray ask the favor of Colo Monroe in page 5, line 17, to strike out the words 'above the mouth of the Appomattox,' which makes none sense of the passage...." The Historical Printing Society publication removes Thomson's notes from the appendix and instead offers them in footnote form throughout the work, according to the original plates to which they refer.

In 1815, Thomson published his work, "A synopsis of the four evangelists : or, A regular history of the conception, birth, doctrine, miracles, death, resurrection, and ascension of Jesus Christ, in the words of the evangelists." It received much acclaim, even from Deist, Thomas Jefferson, who said as much in his letter of 9 January 1816 to Thomson.

== Personal life and death ==
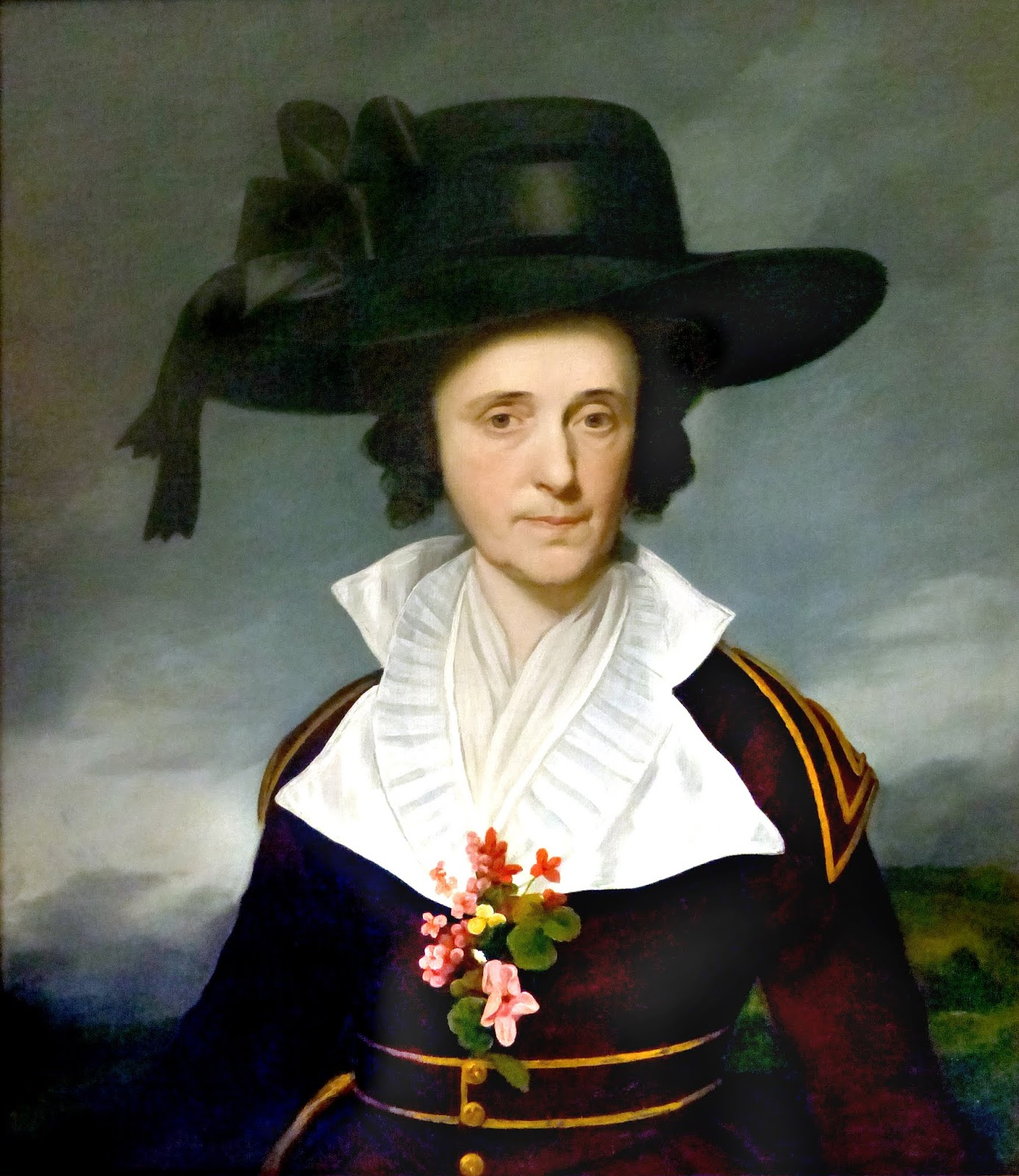
Hannah (Harrison) Thomson, Charles' second wife, by Joseph Wright (c.1785)

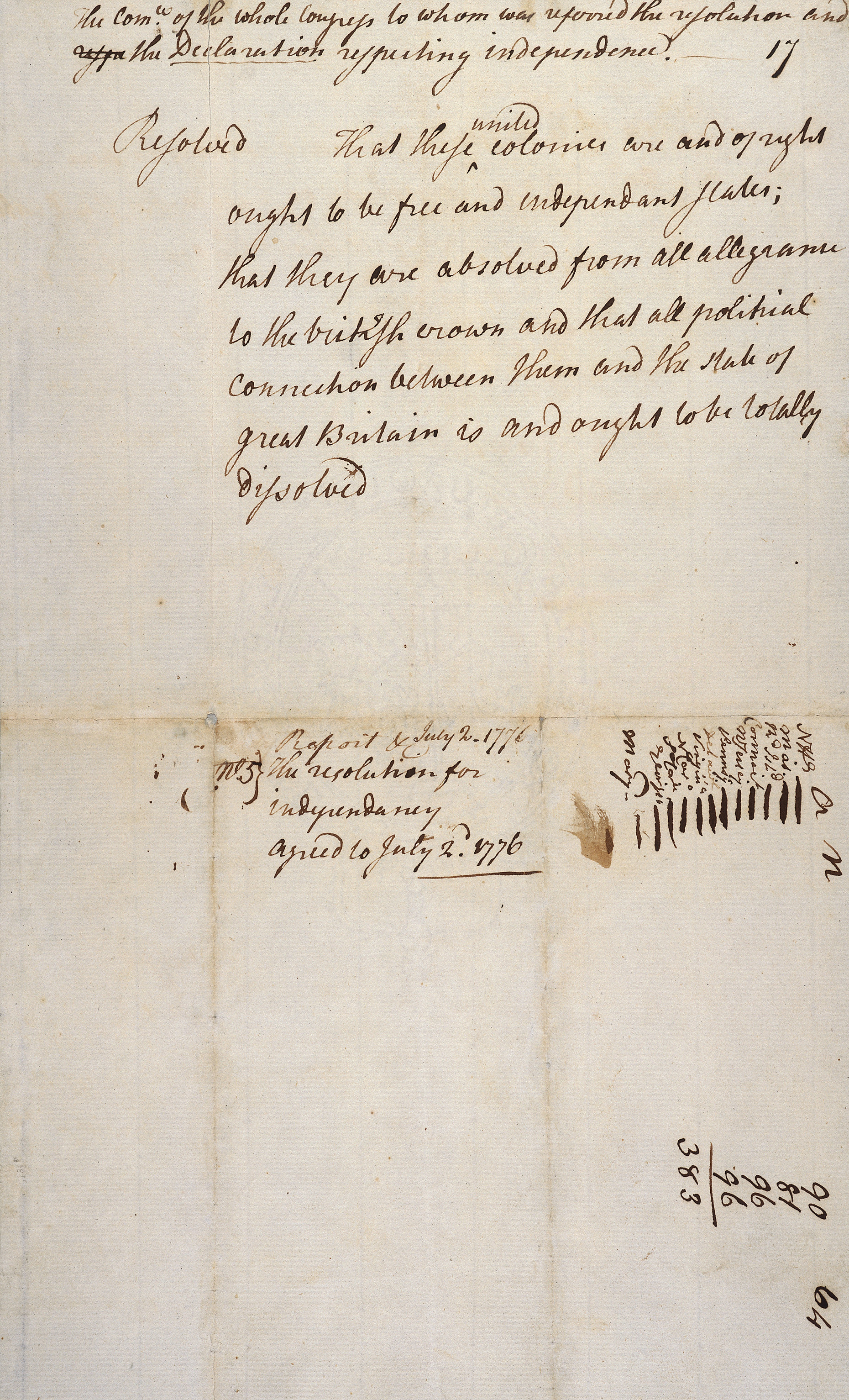
The Lee Resolution in Thomson's handwriting

Thomson married Ruth Mather in 1758. She and their twin infant daughters all died in 1769. On September 1, 1774, he married Hannah Harrison (1728-1807), daughter of Richard Harrison, the owner of Harriton Plantation in what is now Bryn Mawr, Pennsylvania.

Charles Thomson was a Presbyterian. He was a member of the First Presbyterian Church in Philadelphia, where he served as secretary, treasurer, and elder.

Thomson spent his final years at Harriton House, working on a translation of the Septuagint version of the Bible. His was the first English translation of the Septuagint published. The printer was Jane Aitken of Philadelphia. Thomson also published a synopsis of the Four Evangelists in 1815.

In retirement, he pursued his interests in agricultural science and beekeeping. Thomson was elected a member of the American Antiquarian Society in 1813.

According to Thomas Jefferson, writing to John Adams in 1822, Thomson became senile in his old age and was unable to recognize members of his own household. "Is this life?" Jefferson asked. "It is at most but the life of a cabbage; surely not worth a wish."

Thomson died on August 16, 1824. He was initially interred beside his wife in the Harrison Family Cemetery at Harriton. In 1838, a relative had the couple re-interred at Laurel Hill Cemetery in Philadelphia.

== Portrayals ==
Thomson was portrayed by Ralston Hill in both the 1969 Broadway musical 1776 and its 1972 film version and by Gregory Harrison in the 2026 two-part BBC Radio 4 adaptation.

Thomson is depicted on the 1975 seven-cent postal card (and postal reply card), Scott Nos. UX68 and UY 25.

== See also ==
- Continental Congress
  - Journals of the Continental Congress
- Founding Fathers of the United States
