= Louis du Couret =

Louis du Couret or Abd ul-Hamid In (1812 – 1 April 1867) was a French explorer, military officer, and writer.

Louis du Couret was born in France. His father was in the French Army and was a Colonel. du Couret visited Egypt in 1834, before going to the Ethiopian Empire. He was in the Middle East as of 1836. He worked under Muhammad Ali of Egypt in the military and served in the Battle of Nezib. He converted to Islam and made the Hajj before travelling through Arabia between 1844 and 1845. He published the book Life in the Desert, or, Recollections of Travel in Asia and Africa about his travel during that time. He visited Sanaa, Yemen and finished his trip in Sohar, Oman. He returned to France in 1847. He returned to Egypt in 1867 and died 1 April of that year.

Scholars have questioned the authenticity of his writing and stories, including Heinrich Kiepert. His visits to the Zande people were later discovered as being false. His work is held in the collection of the Library of Congress.

== Bibliography ==
- Life in the Desert, or, Recollections of Travel in Asia and Africa, 1860
