= Nicholas Way =

American physician

- Born: 1740s
- Died: 1797
- Occupation: Physician

Nicholas Way (c.1747–1797) was an American physician.

He is from New Castle County, Delaware. Way studied medicine at the University of Pennsylvania, and graduated in 1771. He was elected as a member of the American Philosophical Society in 1773.

He did not fight in the Revolutionary War due to his Quaker beliefs. He joined the Delaware convention that ratified the federal constitution in 1787.

== Yellow fever and death ==
He helped organize the Medical Society of Delaware, becoming a founding member in 1789. During the yellow fever outbreak of 1793 in Philadelphia, Way personally hosted a large group of refugees from the disease at his mansion in Wilmington. The following year, his friend President George Washington appointed him Treasurer of the United States Mint.

He died of yellow fever three years later in 1797.
