= Rebecca Rush =

American novelist (1779–1850)

Rebecca Rush (January 1, 1779–1850) was a writer in the early United States. She published Kelroy, her only known book, in 1812 at the age of 33. The book was not much noticed because it appeared on the eve of the War of 1812, which overshadowed its publication.

== Life ==
Very little is known about Rebecca Rush. The Critical Dictionary of English Literature and British and American Authors (1897) has the following entry about her:

Rush, Miss Rebecca, a daughter of Judge Jacob Rush...was the author of Kelroy, a Novel,
by a Lady of Philadelphia, 1812, 12 mo. Purchased by Bradford and Inskeep for $100.

Rebecca's father was the jurist Jacob Rush. Her mother was Mary "Polly" Rench who married Jacob Rush on November 17, 1777 in Pennsylvania, while avoiding the British Army which had occupied Philadelphia. "Miss Polly" had been a portrait painter, specializing in miniatures before her marriage, and in turn, Charles Willson Peale painted her portrait in 1786.

Rebecca's uncle was Dr. Benjamin Rush, signatory to the 1776 Declaration of Independence.

Another uncle was Dr. James Rench of Cedar Creek Hundred, Sussex County, Delaware, a member of the Delaware Assembly and lieutenant colonel of the Sussex Co. Militia, who was charged with treason during the Revolutionary War.

Rush's uncle by marriage, husband of Sarah Rench, was the colonial portrait painter James Claypoole, Jr.

Rush's maternal grandfather, Captain Walter Rench, a ship master, was lost at sea some 14 years before her birth.
