= Kelroy =

1812 novel by Rebecca Rush

- Author: Rebecca Rush
- Language: English
- Publication date: 1812

Kelroy was published in 1812 by United States writer Rebecca Rush. Although the novel has been much admired by scholars of this period, the book did not receive much attention when it was published. This was probably because it appeared immediately before the War of 1812, so any publicity would have been overshadowed by war news.

The story is about a girl named Emily Hammond who falls in love with a Gothic young man named Kelroy. Mrs. Hammond disapproves of the relationship because she needs Emily to marry someone wealthy in order to keep herself and her family from sinking into abject poverty. Through the use of forged letters, she makes Emily and Kelroy believe that each is no longer in love with the other. The story ends tragically for the mother, daughter, and fiancé.

== Plot ==
After the death of her husband, Mrs. Hammond realizes that she is deeply in debt. She is used to living richly, however, and therefore focuses on her two beautiful daughters as her best hope of financial security. If she can marry them to rich husbands, both she and her daughters will escape poverty.

To accomplish this plan, she pays off all her debts and all the property she can under the guise of grief and moves to the country to save her money. No one must know the extent of her poverty, or the girls will never find a good match. There she waits until her children are old enough to marry and spends the time making them into cultured young ladies: Lucy and Emily Hammond. The girls are not far apart in years, but there are differences between them. While Lucy absorbs the ideas about marriage that her mother imparts (all economically minded), Emily has a romantic personality that resists such material concerns.

When the two girls return to Philadelphia, Pennsylvania, at 17 (Emily) and 18 (Lucy), their looks are a huge success, and they have many admirers. A wealthy and noble Englishman, Mr. Walsingham, finally “bites” and marries Lucy. Emily is not as easily married off, especially after she sees the very moody poet Kelroy.

Kelroy comes from a good family, but like the Hammonds, he has lost his fortune because of his father's love of gambling. He is currently penniless but plans a voyage to India, where he hopes to make his fortune. Emily and Kelroy are a perfect match for each other and quickly fall in love, despite all the attempts Mrs. Hammond makes to separate them. Other suitors, notably Mr. Marney, are very jealous of this obvious attachment. Kelroy has one advantage, however: he is a good friend of Mr. Walsingham, who endeavors to help Kelroy in respect to Mrs. Hammond.

Mr. Walsingham, who had been made to believe that Lucy has a fortune, now knows better and tells Mrs. Hammond that he will ask back for the money Mrs. Hammond has borrowed from him over the last months ($900) if she does not agree to let Kelroy see Emily. Mrs. Hammond is in no position to return the money and reluctantly agrees. The two are engaged but not married before Kelroy leaves for India.

After Lucy and Mr. Walsingham leave for England, Mrs. Hammond's house burns down, and she wins the lottery, which allows the pretext and the means to move to the country (to preserve the money she has left). Emily there meets a rich suitor, Dunlevy. This man is perfectly nice, but Emily still loves Kelroy most and resists Dunlevy's advances.

Only after she receives a letter from Kelroy in which he releases her from the engagement does Emily (deeply grieving) agree to marry Dunlevy. The marriage goes well for six months despite the death of Mrs. Hammond. Then Emily finds some letters her mother had hidden in a writing desk: One of the letters is an exact copy of the one she received from “Kelroy,” and seeing another written to Kelroy in her name, she realizes what her mother (in collusion with Marney) did. Unable to recover from this shock, she dies soon.

Kelroy received a similar letter and has tried to forget about Emily. After hearing that both Emily and Mrs. Hammond have died, he returns to the United States. There, Helen (Emily's best friend) sends Kelroy the packet of letters to prove to him that Emily never quit loving him. The shock of this discovery so affects Kelroy that he borders on the edge of insanity. He decides to begin traveling again, and the ship he sails on sinks into the ocean three weeks after his departure.

== Main characters ==
- Mrs. Hammond: mother of Emily and Lucy, looking to marry each advantageously because the family has been left almost penniless after the death of Mr. Hammond. Uses all kinds of conniving tricks to separate Kelroy and Emily.
- Emily Hammond: Sensitive younger daughter, in love with Kelroy and little interested in making a profitable match. Beautiful. Reluctantly marries Dunlevy, but dies upon finding out that her mother had tricked her into forgetting Kelroy.
- Lucy Hammond: Older daughter, very mindful of making a good match. Marries Mr. Walsingham and moves to England. Cold and insensitive, but beautiful.
- Mrs. Cathcart: Friend of Mrs. Hammond, an incorrigible and very stupid gossip. Heart of gold.
- Helen Cathcart: Unattractive but intelligent friend of Emily's. She eventually marries Dunlevy.
- Charles Cathcart: Brother of Helen, nice gentleman who knows all the other young men.
- Dr. Blake: Little man obsessed with Helen. His love is unrequited.
- Mr. Walsingham: Englishman, husband of Lucy.
- Kelroy: Romantic but penniless suitor to Emily. Engaged to her before he leaves for India but receives a fake letter from her rejecting him while there. Makes his fortune, but never gets to share it with Emily. Dies after learning that Emily loved him all along.
- Mr. Marney: Unsuccessful and callous suitor to Emily, helps Mrs. H trick Emily and Kelroy.
- Mr. Dunlevy: Emily's husband for 6 months after she abandons hope of Kelroy. Marries Helen three years after Emily's death.
